= Ambikanagar =

Ambikanagar Amga Amgajamga
- village/project area
- Location in Karnataka, India Ambikanagar (India)
- Coordinates: 15.1243°N 74.6590°E
- Country: India
- State: Karnataka
- District: Uttara Kannada

Area
  - Total: 3 km^{2} (1.2 sq mi)

Population (2001)
  - Total: 4,848
  - Density: 1,600/km^{2} (4,200/sq mi)

Languages
  - Official: Kannada
- Time zone: UTC+5:30 (IST)
- Postal code: 581363
- Vehicle registration: KA65

Ambikanagar is a small project township approximately 16 km from bustling Dandeli city in the Haliyal taluk of Uttara Kannada district in Karnataka. Ambikanagar is soaked in the green pristine environs of the Western Ghats. The former name of Ambikanagar is believed to be Amga.

This is a settlement built by KPCL for its employees spans approx 3 Square km. Settlement popularly known as colony is classified into two parts 1st Colony and 2nd Colony. Both the colonies complement one another in terms of needs and facilities. If the 1st colony hosts Primary school 2nd colony houses the High school. If the 1st colony houses the administrative office complex the 2nd colony caters to the shopping tastes (a limited manner). Jamga colony is at the far end of the Ambikanagr and thus Ambikanagar closes with a KPCL checkpost at Jamaga colony.

Nagajhari hydel power station is approx 8 km from the settlement. It is the 2nd of the hydel power stations built across the river Kali. It has total of six generating units with a total installed capacity of 900 MW.

== Demographics ==
As of 2001 India census, Ambikanagar had a population of 4848. Males constitute 51% of the population and females 49%. Ambikanagar has an average literacy rate of 75%, higher than the national average of 59.5%; with 55% of the males and 45% of females literate. 9% of the population is under 6 years of age. There were another group of tribes living in jungles called as gavalies and they were around 200 in strength. They supply milk and other necessary things to the people staying around Ambikanagar.

== Places around Ambikanagar ==
Sykes point which is about 5 km from Ambikanagar offers is a splendid panoramic view of the Kali River (Karnataka) flowing through the valley below. This nature spot is named after an Englishman who discovered it during a hunting expedition.

Kali River (Karnataka) is famous for water rafting.

Dandeli offers wildlife safaris where visitors may observe native fauna, including tigers.

There are many temples in Ambikanagar like, Ramlingeshwara temple, Hanuman temple, Ayyappa temple, Lakshmi Temple, Basaveshwar temple. There are one police station, 2 project schools, KHEP Model School and KHEP High School, one big playground which is called as MCG (Model school Cricket Ground). Many cricket tournament are held here. There are separate clubs for men and women. Multi Gym is started here. Communication networks like BSNL, AIRTEL, VODAFONE, JIO are also available here.
