= Mudgeri =

- Village
- Location in Karnataka, India Mudgeri (India)
- Coordinates: 14°54′0″N 74°8′0″E
- Country: India
- State: Karnataka
- District: Uttara Kannada

Government
  - Body: Gram panchayat

Languages
  - Official: Konkani
- Time zone: UTC+5:30 (IST)
- Postal code: 581360
- ISO 3166 code: IN-KA
- Vehicle registration: KA
- Nearest city: Karwar
- Website: karnataka.gov.in

Mudgeri is a village in Karwar Taluka, Uttara Kannada district, Karnataka, India. It is close to the historic fort of Sadashivgad located on Kali river. Konkani is spoken as a local language.

== Location ==
Mudgeri is near to the Goa-Karnataka border. It is close to the wayside railway station at Asnoti which falls under the jurisdiction of the Konkan Railway.

== Demographics ==
As per the 2011 Census of India, Mudgeri had a population of 2,498 (1,176 male and 1,322 female) across 675 households, with a literacy rate of 91.69%.

== Places of Attraction ==
- Shivnath Temple
- Shri Mahalasha Narayani Devasthan Temple
- Mudgeri Dam
- Mahasati Temple
- Ganapati Temple
- Shri Bramhadev
- Bomnath Mountain
- Venkatraman Temple
- Siddeshwar Temple
