= Yadoga =

Village in Karnataka, India

- Yadoga
- Country: India
- State: Karnataka
- District: Uttara kannada
- Taluk: Haliyal
- Elevation: 567 m (1,860 ft)

Languages
  - Official: Kannada, Konkani, Marathi
- Time zone: UTC+5:30 (IST)
- Postal code: 581329

Yadoga is a village in Uttar kannada district in the state of Karnataka, India. It is near Haliyal with a Marathi population, 101 kilometres (63 mi) east of the district headquarters of Karwar, 5 kilometres (3.1 mi) from Haliyal, and 472 kilometres (293 mi) from the state capital of Bangalore. Dharwad, Hubli, Dandeli, and Belgaum are nearby cities.
