= Adikehosur =

- village
- Interactive map of Adikehosur
- Coordinates: 15.2101°N 74.7937°E
- Country: India
- State: Karnataka
- District: Uttara Kannada
- Talukas: Haliyal

Government
  - Body: Village Panchayat

Languages
  - Official: Kannada
- Time zone: UTC+5:30 (IST)
- Nearest city: Uttara Kannada
- Civic agency: Village Panchayat

Adikehosur is a village in the southern state of Karnataka, India. It is located in the Haliyal taluk of Uttara Kannada district in Karnataka.

== See also ==
- Uttara Kannada
- Districts of Karnataka
