= Dandeli =

- City
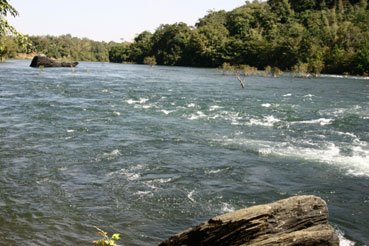
- Kali River
- Nickname: Green City
- Location in Karnataka, India
- Coordinates: 15.252257°N 74.622185°E
- Country: India
- State: Karnataka
- Region: Malenadu
- District: Uttara Kannada

Government
  - Type: Democratic
  - Body: City Municipal Council

Area
  - Total: 8.5 km^{2} (3.3 sq mi)
- Elevation: 472 m (1,549 ft)

Population (2011)
  - Total: 52,108
  - Density: 6,100/km^{2} (16,000/sq mi)

Languages
  - Official: Kannada
- Time zone: UTC+5:30 (IST)
- PIN: 581325
- Telephone code: +91 8284
- Vehicle registration: KA 65
- Website: www.dandelicity.mrc.gov.in

Dandeli is a taluk in Uttara Kannada district of Karnataka, India, in the Malenadu region.

== Description ==
=== Old Dandeli ===
As per the 1930 year, the population of Dandeli was only 515 and predominantly worked in the forestry department and government sawmill. Most residents belonged to the Konkanis, Devali, Marathas, Kuruba, Lambani and African communities. The settlement was located on the bank of the Kali river and developed into an industrial town with the establishment of a number of companies, including The Indian Plywood Manufacturing Company, Lalbhai Ferro-manganese Factory, West Coast Paper Mill, Indian Saw Mill, and a number of small industries around the Dandeli and Karnataka Power Corporation which were engaged in the construction of several power-generating dams at different places along the Kali river. The place was later called new-Dandeli.

There was no school in the small town until in 1936, when Shivaji Narvekar, Pundalik Pai, Sadanand Gopal Nadkarni, Balappa Chavan and Bapshet together contributed to build a one-room school in a hut on the nearby hill where now the government Urdu school is situated. Ramachandra Ganapat Nayak migrated from Sanikatta near Gokarn to run the school. The school started with merely 18 students, three of whom were older than their teacher, R.G. Nayak. In 1939 the school was recognised by the British government.

=== Name ===
A local legend states that the city is named after Dandelappa, a local deity, a servant of the Mirashi landlords, who died because of his loyalty. An alternative legend states that a king named Dandakanayaka passed through the forests and named them after himself, and the city is believed to stand on the place where Dandakaranya stood when he named the area.

== Geography and climate ==
Dandeli is located at 15.267°N 74.617°E. It has an average elevation of 473 metres (1,552 ft) and has received heavy rainfall during August to November (see chart below). Because of good forest cover and moderate elevation, the location has a tropical highland climate, averaging about 27 °C (81 °F) in summer and 18 °C (64 °F) in winter.

Climate data for Dandeli, KA, India (1961–1990)
| Month | Jan | Feb | Mar | Apr | May | Jun | Jul | Aug | Sep | Oct | Nov | Dec | Year |
|---|---|---|---|---|---|---|---|---|---|---|---|---|---|
| Mean daily maximum °C (°F) | 22.4 (72.3) | 26.1 (79.0) | 30.4 (86.7) | 31.3 (88.3) | 33.8 (92.8) | 26.2 (79.2) | 24.5 (76.1) | 23.1 (73.6) | 27.1 (80.8) | 25.3 (77.5) | 23.2 (73.8) | 22.7 (72.9) | 26.3 (79.4) |
| Mean daily minimum °C (°F) | 8.3 (46.9) | 12.2 (54.0) | 16.8 (62.2) | 20.6 (69.1) | 23.1 (73.6) | 20.1 (68.2) | 18.1 (64.6) | 15.3 (59.5) | 12.1 (53.8) | 9.3 (48.7) | 8.7 (47.7) | 6.1 (43.0) | 14.2 (57.6) |
| Average precipitation mm (inches) | — | 124 (4.9) | 123 (4.8) | 57.3 (2.26) | 34.3 (1.35) | 88.9 (3.50) | 263.4 (10.37) | 890.3 (35.05) | 1,452.7 (57.19) | 2,324.1 (91.50) | 1,229.6 (48.41) | 226.1 (8.90) | — |
Source: Hong Kong Observatory

Dandeli is located 104 km from its district headquarters Karwar and 74 km from Hubli. The State Highway 46 pass through the town of Dandeli. Dandeli also has railway connectivity; its station code is DGD(formerly called as Ambewadi). As of February 2026, only a DEMU Rail to Alnavar Junction thrice a day exists.

As per KSNDMC, in 2025, Dandeli hobli received an annual rainfall of 1,142.6 millimetres (44.98 in) with (-17%) departure.

=== Wildlife sanctuary ===
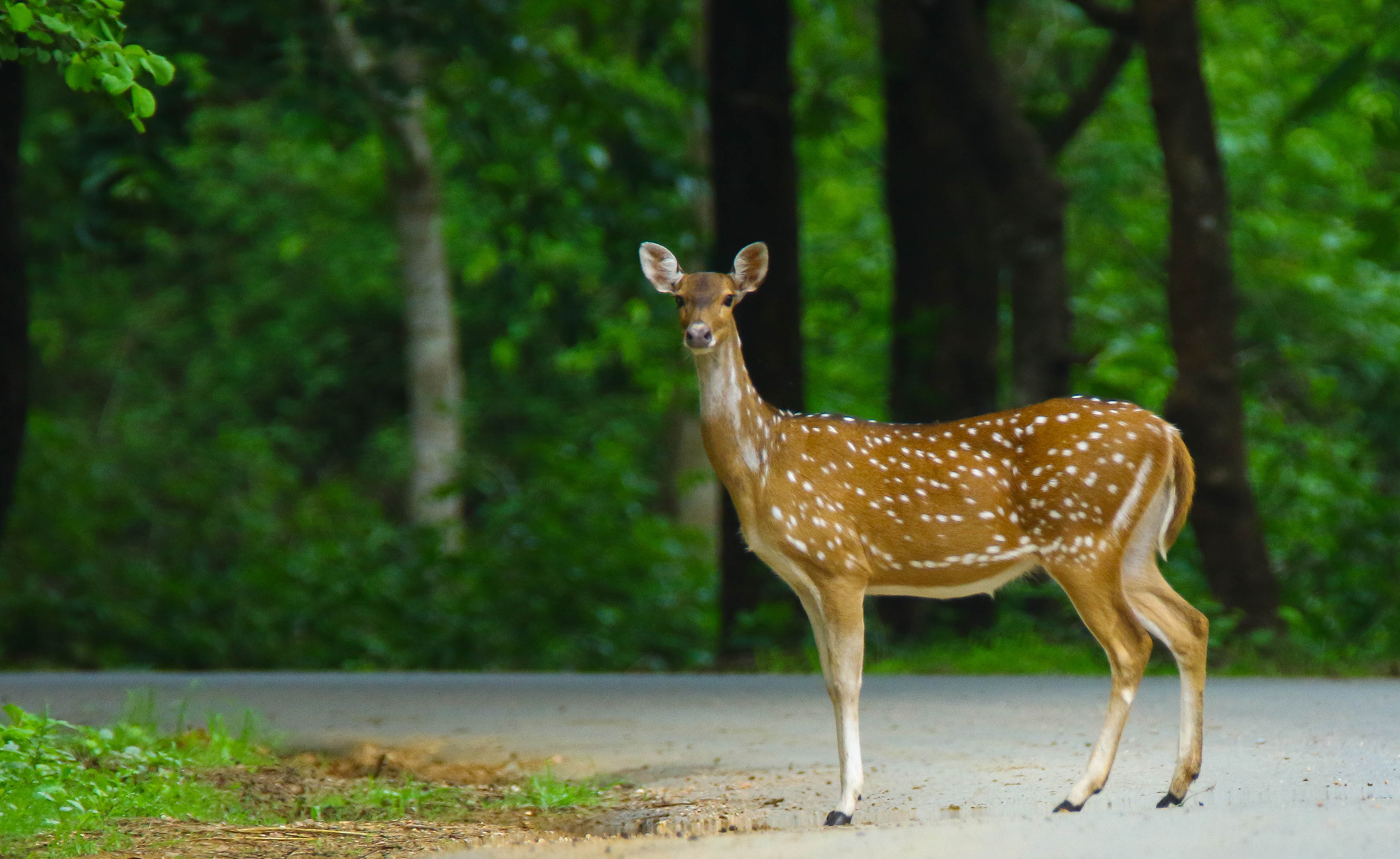
A deer spotted in the wildlife sanctuary

Dandeli is a natural habitat for wildlife, including tigers, leopards, black panthers, elephants, gaur, deer, antelopes, and bears. It is the second largest wildlife sanctuary in Karnataka and was designated as a tiger reserve in 2007. The jungle is also home to several varieties of reptiles and almost 270 varieties of birds. The rapid expansion of industry has raised fears of ecological damage to the area, and local volunteer groups have formed to address the issue.

== Demographics ==
As of the 2001 India census, Dandeli had a population of 53,287. Males constitute 51% of the population and females 49%. Dandeli has an average literacy rate of 74%, higher than the national average of 65%: male literacy is 81% and female literacy is 68%. In Dandeli, 11% of the population is under six years of age. Kannada is the widely spoken language in the region. Dandeli's population was higher in the past, but lack of employment has forced people to migrate elsewhere. Jobs pay poorly, and traditional businesses have been disappearing for lack of customers. The West Coast Paper Mills is one of the largest employers in the town and the primary landowner; the mill has its own quarters, shopping complex, theatre, restaurant, playground, and a clubhouse for the employees. The company was established in 1955 with corporate backing from Shree Digvijay Cement Company Limited, Sikka, Gujarat State. This company is also the main contributor to unpleasant odor affecting an otherwise very pleasant city.

== Education ==
=== Schools in Dandeli ===
- St Michaels Convent School, Dandeli (Primary and High School)
- Rotary School, Dandeli (Primary and High School)
- Janata Vidyalaya, Dandeli (Primary and High school both Kannada and English medium)
- DFA School
- Anglo Urdu High School (Muslim Education Society Dandeli)
- Government School, Dandeli
- Kanya Vidyalaya, Dandeli
- Tauheed Education Society
- Bangur Nagar Hindi Higher Secondary School (Dandeli Education Society Hindi School)
- BLDE Education Society
- Govt. School Bilpar Dandeli (Primary and High school)
- Bangur Nagar Kannada Higher Primary School
- Adarsh Vidyalaya School (Ambewadi)
- Government Primary School, Ambewadi
- Paridyan School

=== Pre-university colleges ===
- Bangur Nagar Pre-University Composite Junior College
- Janata Vidyalaya
- Tauheed Education Society
- Government College Old Dandeli
- Kanya Vidyalaya Pre-university College Dandeli
- K.L.E. Society's Institute of Nursing Sciences, Dandeli

=== Degree colleges ===
- DES Bangaur Nagar Degree College
- Govt Degree College, Dandeli
- Govt Degree College, Old Dandeli

=== Other institutions ===
- Sarvatomukh Vikas Kendra Dandeli (RI)
- S.V.K.'s Andakarimth Udyog Margadarshi Kendra Dandeli
- Kali Seva Pratistan Ganesh Nagar Dandeli
- Govt. Tool Room & Training Centre: Ambewadi Industrial Estate
- Asha Kiran Rural Private Industrial Training Institute, Ambewadi, under the aegis of Karwar Diocesan Development Council, Bishop's House, Karwar
- S.U.C. Polytechnic, Dandeli
- VTU- National Academy for Skill Development, Dandeli

== Tourism ==
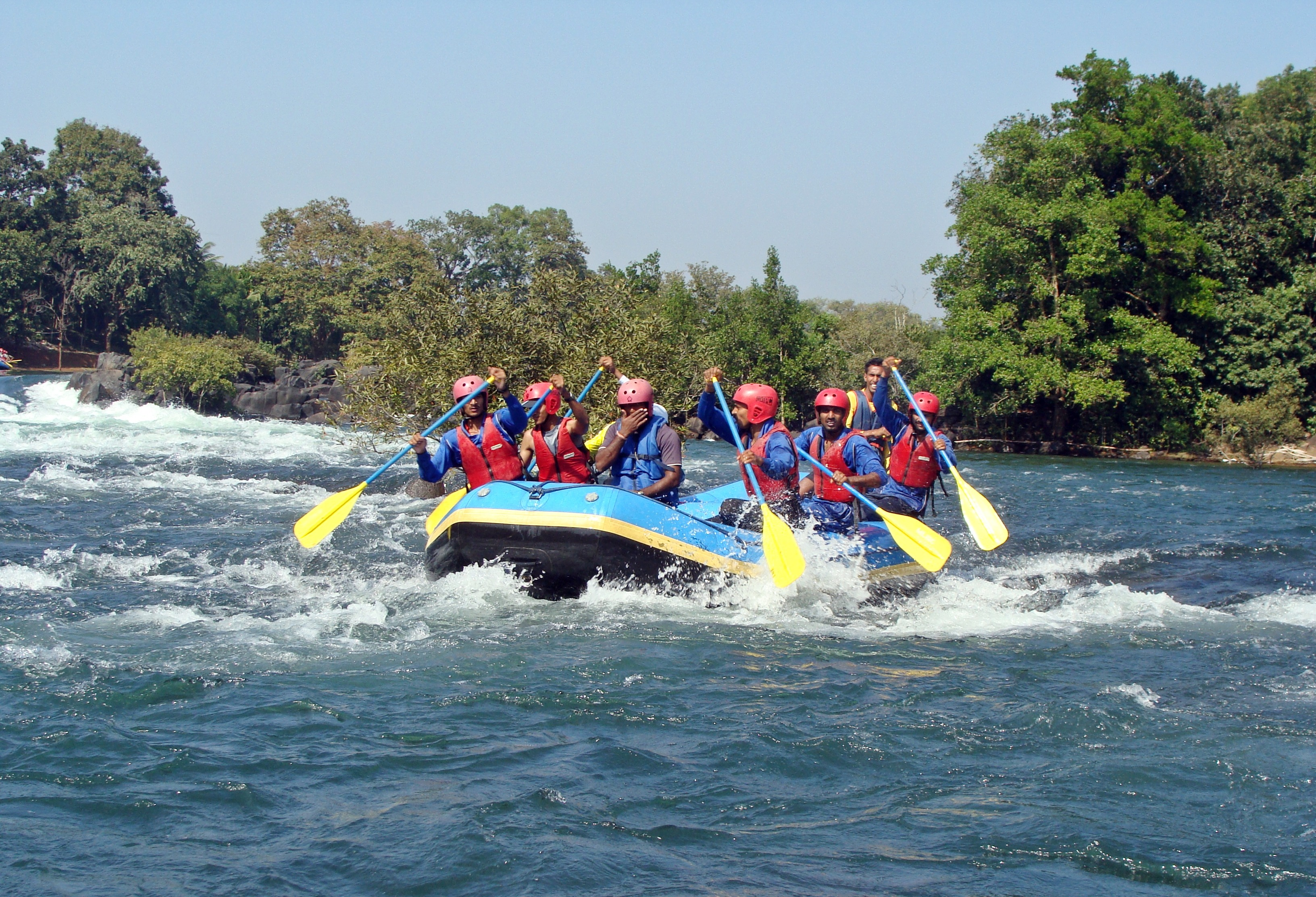
White water rafting near Dandeli

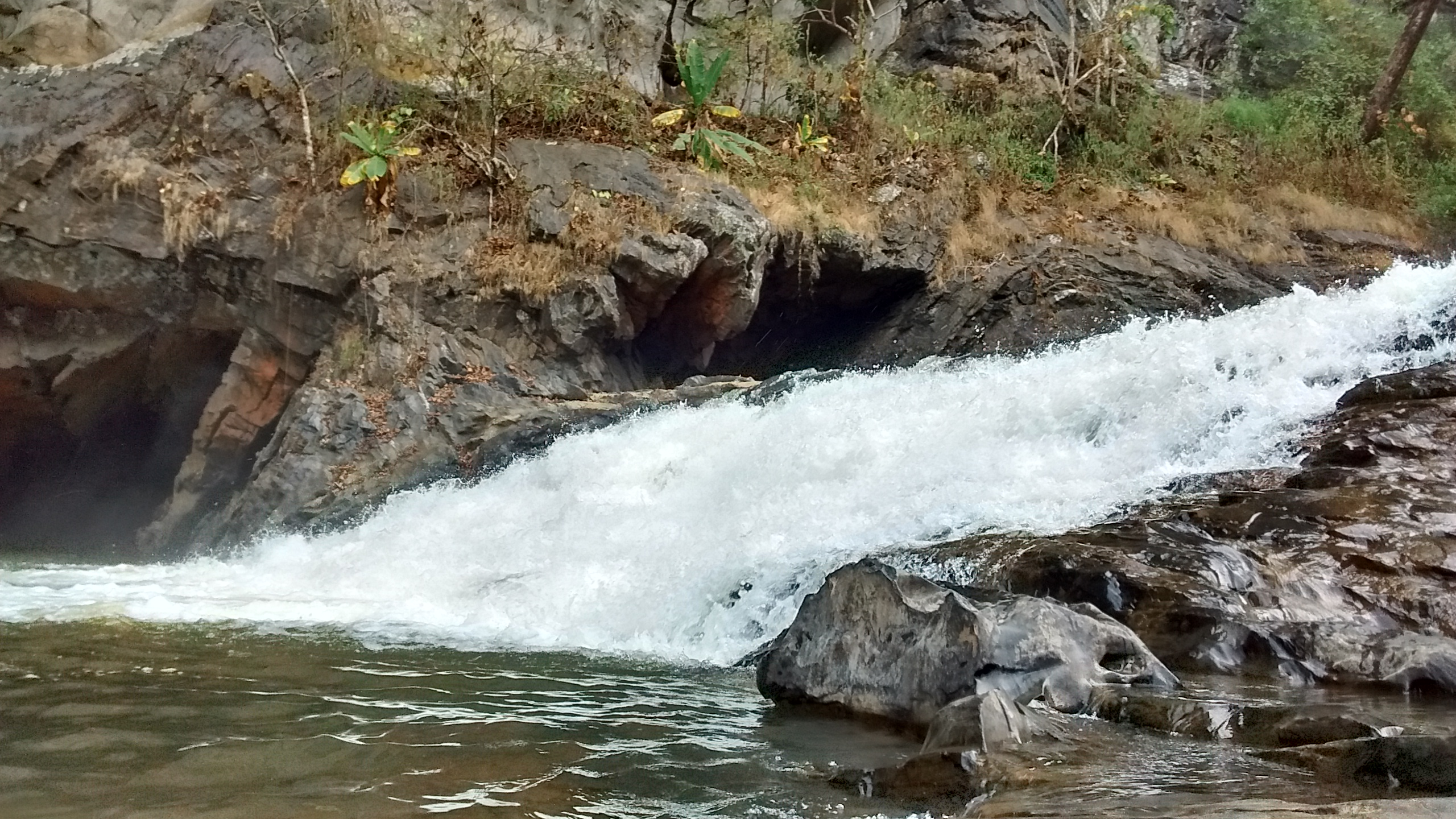
Sintheri Rocks formation

=== Stay in Dandeli ===
Dandeli resorts have become an attraction for wealthier, mobile residents from India and elsewhere. The biodiversity in the forest has attracted sufficient tourism to support a number of resorts in the vicinity of Dandeli. The government has promoted eco-tourism with proper planning of the healthy breeding of wild animals.

The natural environment of the area attracts tourists from other parts of India and abroad. It is an adventure sports destination, and a white-water rafting destination in South India. It is one of the few locations where rafting is possible even in peak summer months of March to June. Dandeli also offers many other adventure activities like Kayaking, Zorbing, Jungle safari, Cannoeing, River crossing etc.

=== Temples and Matha ===
- Dandelappa Temple (Haliyal Road)
- Shree Ishwar Temple (Old Dandeli)
- Shree Veerabhadreshwar Temple (JN Road)
- Shiva Mandir (Kogilban Road))
- Mrutyunjay Math (Bank of River Kali)
- Datta Mandir (Kogilban Road)
- Shree Nagadevata Mandir (Ambewadi)
- Shree Ram Mandir (WCPM Area)
- Shree Balamuri Ganesh Mandir (Ganesh Gudi Road)
- Shree Raghavendra Swami Math (Town ship)
- Shankaracharya Math (Town ship)
- Venkataramana Temple (Kogilban Road)
- Jagadamba Temple – Savji's (Maruti Nagar)
- Hanuman temple (JN Road)
- Sai Baba Temple (Basveshwar Nagar, Ambewadi)
- Shree Durga Devi Temple (Near Government Hospital, JN Road)

=== Landmarks ===
Dandeli is surrounded by natural, historic, and religious landmarks: the River Kali, the caves of Kavala, the Syntheri Rocks, the Ulavi temple, and Sykes point. Karnataka Power Corporation residential colony is situated in Ambikanagar. (18 kilometres or 11 miles from Dandeli). Nagajhari powerhouse is also nearby Ambikanagar where electricity is generated through hydropower. Also, other hydroelectric projects of KPCL like Supa dam, Tattihalla dam, Bommanahalli dam are located surrounding Dandeli town.

=== Other attractions ===
The sanctuary provides rafting opportunities at the Virnoli Rapids connected to the Kali River. Other tourist activities include nature walks, boating, bird watching, crocodile spotting and angling. Nearby tourist spots include Ulavi, Syntheri Rocks, Anashi National Park, and Moulangi Eco Park.

== See also ==
- Karwar
- Mangalore
- Sirsi
