= Haliyal =

Haliyala
- Town
- Location in Karnataka, India
- Coordinates: 15°19′50″N 74°45′53″E
- Country: India
- State: Karnataka
- District: Uttara Kannada
- Elevation: 559 m (1,834 ft)

Population (2001)
  - Total: 20,652

Languages
  - Official: Kannada
- Time zone: UTC+5:30 (IST)
- PIN: 581329
- Vehicle registration: KA65
- Lok Sabha constituency: Uttara Kannada
- Vidhan Sabha constituency: Haliyal
- Website: haliyalatown.mrc.gov.in

Haliyal is a town in Uttara Kannada in the Indian state of Karnataka. It is the headquarters town for Haliyal Taluk.

== Geography ==
Aquifer Map of Haliyal Taluk

Tank Map of Haliyal Taluk

Haliyal has an average elevation of 559 metres (1834 feet).

== Demographics ==
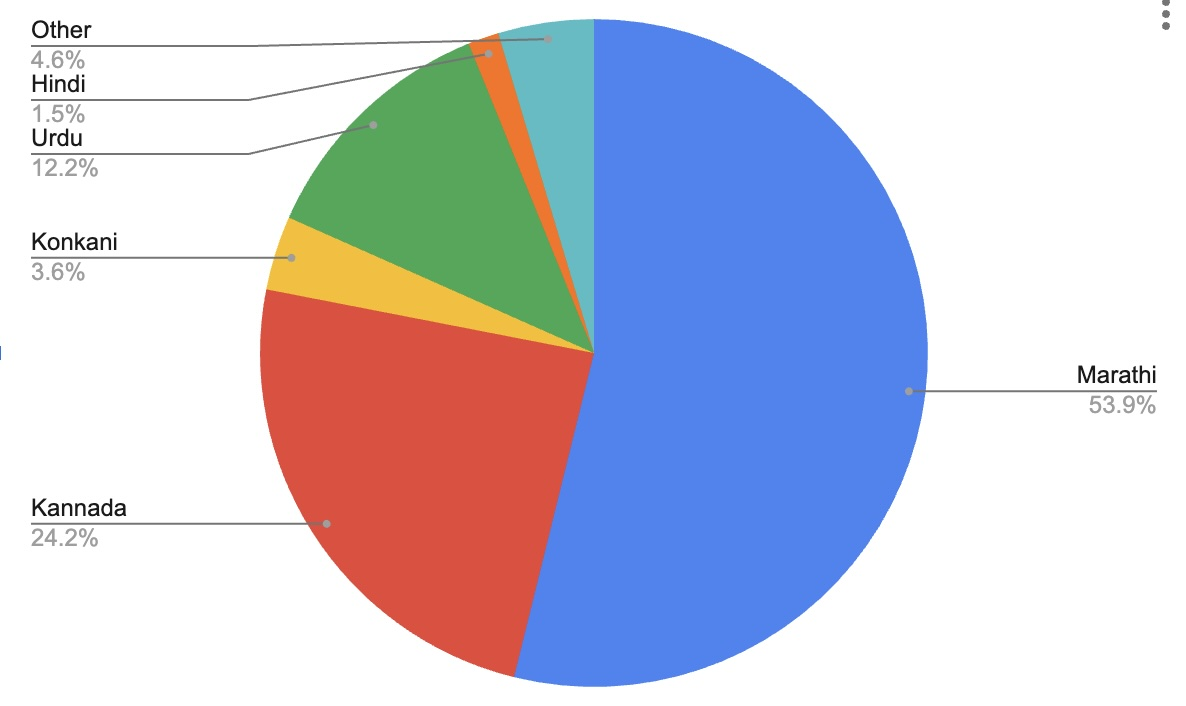
Haliyal Demographics

In the 2001 Indian census, Haliyal had a population of 20,652. Males constituted 51% of the population. Haliyal had an average literacy rate of 66%, higher than the national average (59.5%); male literacy was 72%, and female literacy was 60%. In 2001 in Haliyal, 13% of the population was under 6 years of age. Kannada is the official language; however, Marathi is the main language in the city.

== See also ==
- Dandeli
- Supa Dam
- Ulavi
- Sathodi Falls
- Kali River
