= Sadashivgad =

Village located in Karwar District

Coordinates: 14.8542680°N 74.1316562°E

View of Sadashivgad Hill fort from the Kali River Bridge.

Sadashivgad or Sadashivagada is a village located in Karwar, Uttara Kannada district, in the state of Karnataka in India. Significant and picturesque, it is now a popular tourist destination located by the Kali river bridge, which has been built at the confluence of the river and the Arabian Sea.

== Geography and structure ==
The fort was built on an old fortified site on the north bank of Kali River where it meets the sea. It had about 8 meters high ramparts which were about 2 metres wide at the top. There were towers and openings for guns. The citadel was at the highest point. An outwork was on the west, near the sea at the base of the cliff and was appropriately called Pani Killa. There was another outwork on the eastern slope. The citadel had single arched gateway.

Samvargad was a very small fort, about 60 metres by 20 metres on top of a hillock east of Sadashivgad. It was a satellite fort guarding the former on its east and northeast. Very few ruins remain.

== History ==
Sadashivgad Fort and Kali River Bridge view from Nandangadda village.

=== Etymology ===
The fort was named Sadashivgad by Basavlingraj after his father Sadashivlingraj in 1715. They were chieftains of Sonda who assumed the title of 'Raja' after incorporating Chittakula, Simveshwar (Angadi), Kadra, Kadwada, Ankola and some other parts of Canara. The old Karwar fort was pulled down and its material used to build Sadashivgad.

=== Early history ===
Cintacora as known to the Portuguese was a very old port and was also known as Chitrakul(Chittakula) and Sindpur. When Sadashivgad was built in this area, the village also came to be known by that name.

A fort existed at Cintacora which was captured and burnt by the Portuguese in 1510. They called it Pir fort due to the Muslim Dargah (tomb of a Sufi saint Shah Karamuddin) they found there - and was known in Portuguese as Forte de Piro or Pito.

The creek at the mouth of the Kali River was a trading center from early days. It came into greater prominence after Sadashivgad was built and the Portuguese realized the advantages of its sheltered harbor.

=== Early trade ===
In 1638 a rival English trading body, the Courteen Association, established a factory at Karwar. Muslin was the chief commodity purchased but Karwar was also a source for pepper, cardamom, cassier and coarse blue cotton cloth. Situated on India's west coast, 50 miles south-east of Goa, Karwar was noted for its safe harbour. In 1649 the Courteen Association united with the Company and Karwar became a Company factory.

=== Maratha influence ===
Having marched from Bednore in the south, visiting on his way the sacred temple at Gokarna, Shivaji seized Ankola and the next day came to Karwar (then known as Kadwada). Both the East India Company and Sher Shah, the sardar of Bijapur, were very much alarmed at this sudden development. They collected huge amount and offering it to Shivaji, prayed that they may be spared. Satisfied at the recognition of his authority, Shivaji crossed the Kali River and conquered Sadashivgad on 21 February 1665;

=== Portuguese and East India Company rule ===
Owing to the hostility of the Raja of Sonda, the factory was closed in 1720 and was not reopened until 1750. War broke out in the meanwhile between the Portuguese and the Raja of Sonda. The Raja of Sonda had helped the English establish a factory in Karwar. This was not liked by the Portuguese. In May 1752 the Portuguese sent a fleet and captured the Sonda fort, Sadashivgad but was given back on restoration of peace when the Portuguese were allowed to build a fort at Bhatkal. The Portuguese claimed the monopoly of the Karwar trade and as they were in a position to enforce their claim, the English agent was withdrawn.

It passed on to Tipu Sultan in 1793 and finally to the East India Company in 1799 after the Battle of Seringapatam in which Tipu died.

- In the Treaty of Mangalore(1784) one finds reference of Karwar and Sadashivgad written as Carwar and Sadasewgude.
- Karwar since the records of 1862, the time from which it fell under Bombay Presidency, was described as the first-rate harbor between Bombay and Colombo.

== Current condition ==
The fort is in ruins as most of it was pulled down by East India Company Brigadier-General Richard Matthews in 1783. A road now runs between it and its satellite fort Samvargad.

Midway on the Sadashivagad hill is the many centuries old Shantadurga Temple, known for its serenity. From the peak of the hill people view the Sun setting in the Arabian Sea. The 17th century Dargah also attracts a lot of Muslim pilgrims.

At a distance of approximately 2 km northwards a village lies by name Shiveshvar which got Fortress Kot Shiveshvar (mentioned in the Mangalore treaty between Tipu Sultan and the East India Company, as well as in earlier historical accounts) built exclusively for guarding the northern borders of Canara. It was built by the Bijapur Sultanate and subsequently its fortunes were connected to the Sadashivgad Fort. This fort is in a shambles but the eastern gate, a Muslim graveyard, well and tunnel can still be seen.

Another important village is Kadwada situated on the banks of tributary of the Kali River, from which the name 'Karwar' has been derived. At this location the British used to have a factory and it was an important trade port in earlier days. It also had a large Muslim population and a larger mosque which was frequented by traders from Arabia and Africa.

The National Highway NH-66 continues on a bridge built over Kali River and the road splits the Sadashivgad granite hill to connect Karnataka to Goa.

== Reaching Sadashivgad ==
=== By train ===
The closest railway stations are Karwar and Asnoti; though transport facilities are better available at the larger station of Karwar.

=== By road ===
Karnataka State Road Transport Corporation (KSRTC) buses as well as Goa state owned Kadamba Transport Corporation buses ply regularly on the NH-66. Apart from State transport, a number of private operators run their bus services on the same route.

== Trivia ==
- Sadashivgad used to be a popular word for native konkani speaking people travelling from Mumbai to Karwar before the advent of Konkan Railway. In Konkani language, it is mostly referred to as simply 'Gad' or 'Gadar'.
- Jayshree Gadkar a noted Marathi movie actress and a star of Marathi cinema in the 1960s was born in a konkani speaking family at Kanasgiri village in Sadashivgad.

== See also ==
- Karwar
- Kali River
- Asnoti
