= Sathodi Falls =

Waterfalls near Sirsi, Karnataka

Coordinates: 14.948°N 74.586°E

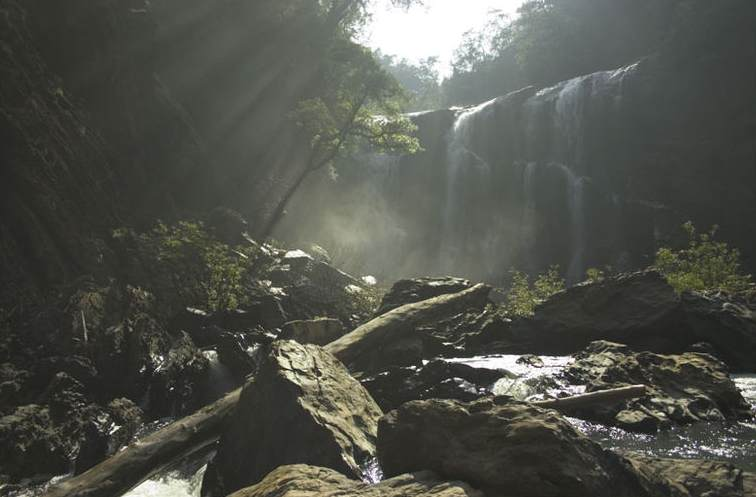
An early morning view of Sathoddi Falls

Sathodi Falls (also spelt as Sathoddi Falls) is a waterfall located in the Western Ghats, Uttara Kannada District Located 32 km (20 mi) from Yellapur and 74 km (46 mi) from Sirsi. It is about 15 metres (49.2 feet) tall. The stream then flows into the backwaters of the Kodasalli Dam, into the Kali River.

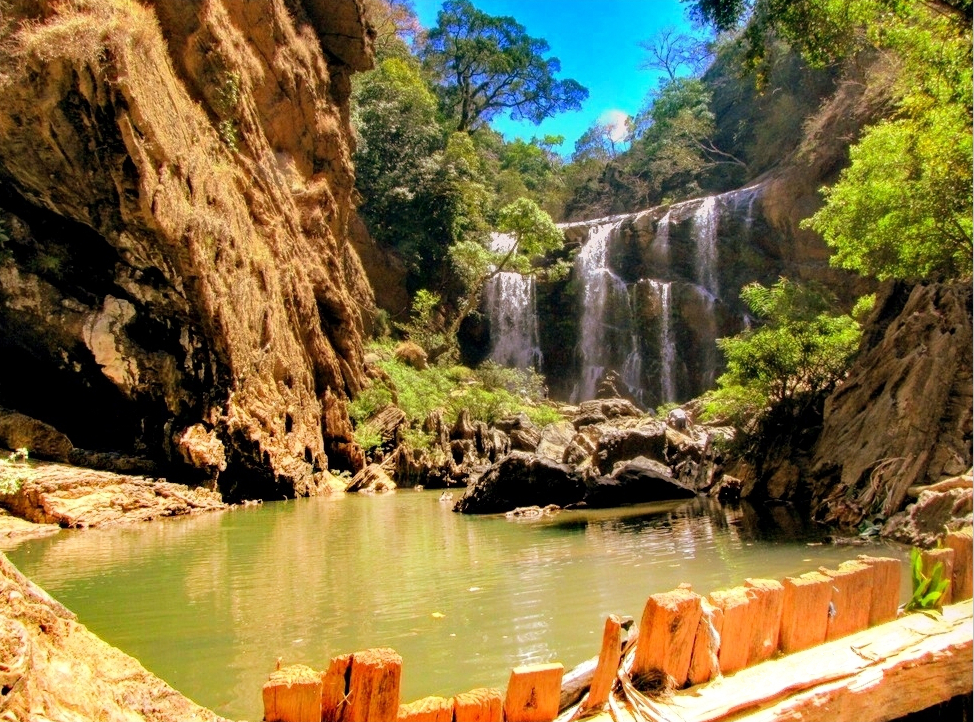
Sathoddi Falls

== See also ==
- List of waterfalls
- List of waterfalls in India
