= Nandangadda =

- village
- Sadashivgad Fort & Kali Bridge as seen from Nandangadda Village

- Location in Karnataka, India Nandangadda (India)
- Coordinates: 14.83290°N 74.14723°E
- Country: India
- State: Karnataka
- District: Uttara Kannada

Languages
  - Official: Konkani, Kannada
- Time zone: UTC+5:30 (IST)
- PIN: 581304
- Nearest city: Karwar

Nandangadda is a coastal village located in Karwar Taluka of Uttara Kannada district, in the Indian state of Karnataka.

== Main Attraction ==
- The Jai Shri Santoshimata Temple located in Nandangadda is a must visit.
- The view of the Kali river estuary merging with the Arabian sea can be seen from here.
- The above said view is better seen from an age old temple by name Naagnaath Temple also known as Aarav in the local language of konkani spoken by the majority residents. This temple is dedicated to the Lord Snake King.

== Landmarks in Nandangadda ==
- Naagnaath Temple located on the beds of Kali River.
- Samadevi Devasthan - The oldest and famous landmark of this village
- Sree Samadevi Mangal Karyalaya - A community hall catering for functions - The old Smita Talkies once stood here, before it was pulled down.
- Jai Shri Santoshimata Temple located on the coastline.
- Gindi Devi temple
- Nandangadda Fish Market

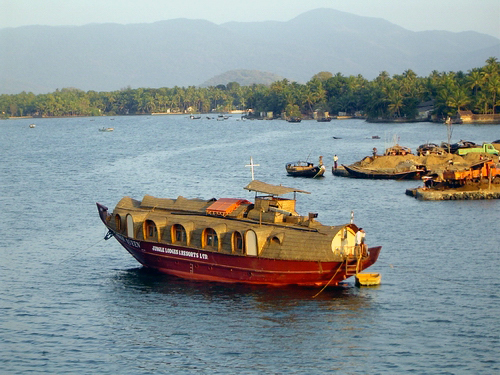
Leisure boats on Kali River as seen from the bridge built over Kali River. Nandangadda village can be seen on the shores

== See also ==
- Ankola
- Mangalore
