= Ulavi =

Village in Karnataka, India

- Village
- Location within Karnataka Location within India
- Coordinates: 15°0′19″N 74°30′34″E
- Country: India
- State: Karnataka
- District: Uttara Kannada district
- Taluk: Joida (Supa)

Languages
  - Official: Kannada
- Time zone: UTC+5:30 (IST)
- PIN: 581187
- Telephone code: 08383
- Vehicle registration: KA-65

Ulavi is a village in the Uttara Kannada district in the Indian state of Karnataka. Ulavi is a village about 75 kilometres (47 mi) from Karwar (via Kumbarawada) in Karnataka state, India.

Ulavi is an important center of pilgrimage for people of the Lingayat faith. The temple has been served by the trust of Kittur family for more than 200 years. The Samadhi of Channabasavanna, one of the most revered saints of the Lingayat faith, lies here. In the 12th century, Channabasavanna traveled from Kalyana to Ulavi before he died. Very close to this holy Samadhi is the Akka Nagalambike cave named after Nagalambike, Channabasavanna's mother and Basavanna's sister. The Ulavi jathre or congregations attracts pilgrims from all over Karnataka.

Ulavi is located at western ghats. Thick forests here hold tiger, cheeta, elephant, sarang, cobra, and other wildlife.

The closest settlements are Dandeli, Dharwad, Hubli. Three buses daily serve the village via Dharwad from Hubli, Chitradurga, Haveri and Belgum.

Other local areas of interest include Sintheri Rock, Kali River, Anashi Reserve Forest, and Supa Dam. Ulavi Temple Trust phone no# 9148750801 & 9108550806.

== See also ==
- Karwar
- Mangalore
