= Supa Dam =

Joida
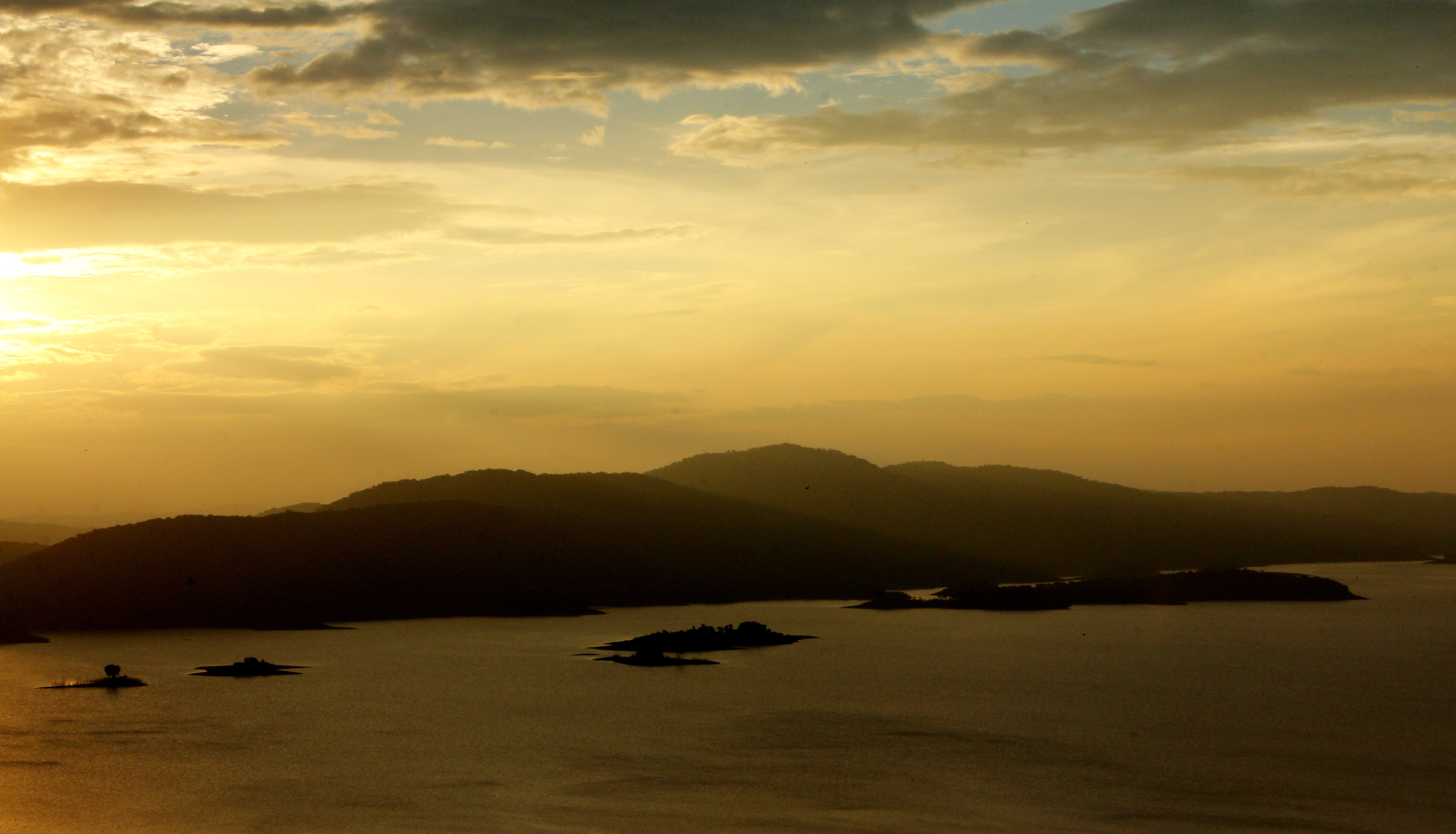
- The Back waters of Supa Dam.

- Location within Karnataka Location within India
- Country: India
- Location: Joida
- Coordinates: 15°16′34″N 74°31′36″E
- Status: Operational
- Construction began: 1974
- Opening date: 1987

Dam and spillways
- Type of dam: Concrete gravity
- Impounds: Kalinadi River
- Height: 101 m (331 ft)
- Length: 332 m (1,089 ft)

Reservoir
- Total capacity: 4,178,000,000 m^{3} (3,387,160 acre⋅ft)
- Active capacity: 4,115,000,000 m^{3} (3,336,085 acre⋅ft)
- Catchment area: 1,057 km^{2} (408 mi^{2})

Power Station
- Commission date: 1985
- Hydraulic head: 72 m (236 ft) (design)
- Turbines: 2 x 50 MW Francis-type
- Installed capacity: 100 MW

Supa Dam is built across Kalinadi (Kannada) or Kali river in the state of Karnataka in India and is the tallest dam in Karnataka. The 101 meters high and 332 meters long dam has 3 gates of 15x10 meters. The dam's gross capacity is 4.178 cubic km or 147 tmc ft. It is situated at GaneshaGudi, which is in Joida taluk of Uttara Kannada district. The dam forms the main storage reservoir to all the power houses in Kalinadi hydro power project of total installed capacity of 1180MW, which includes the main 810-MW Nagzari power house. The power house at the foot of the dam has two 50-MW electricity generators. The electricity generated is supplied to different parts of Karnataka. The dam was built by Hindustan Steel Works Construction Limited and is designed, owned and operated by Karnataka Power Corporation Limited, owned by the government of Karnataka. The power house was commissioned in 1985. The dam is basically used for generation of hydro electricity.

== See also ==
- List of dams and reservoirs in India.
