= Kodasalli Dam =

Dam in Karnataka, India

Coordinates: 14°55′10″N 74°32′7″E

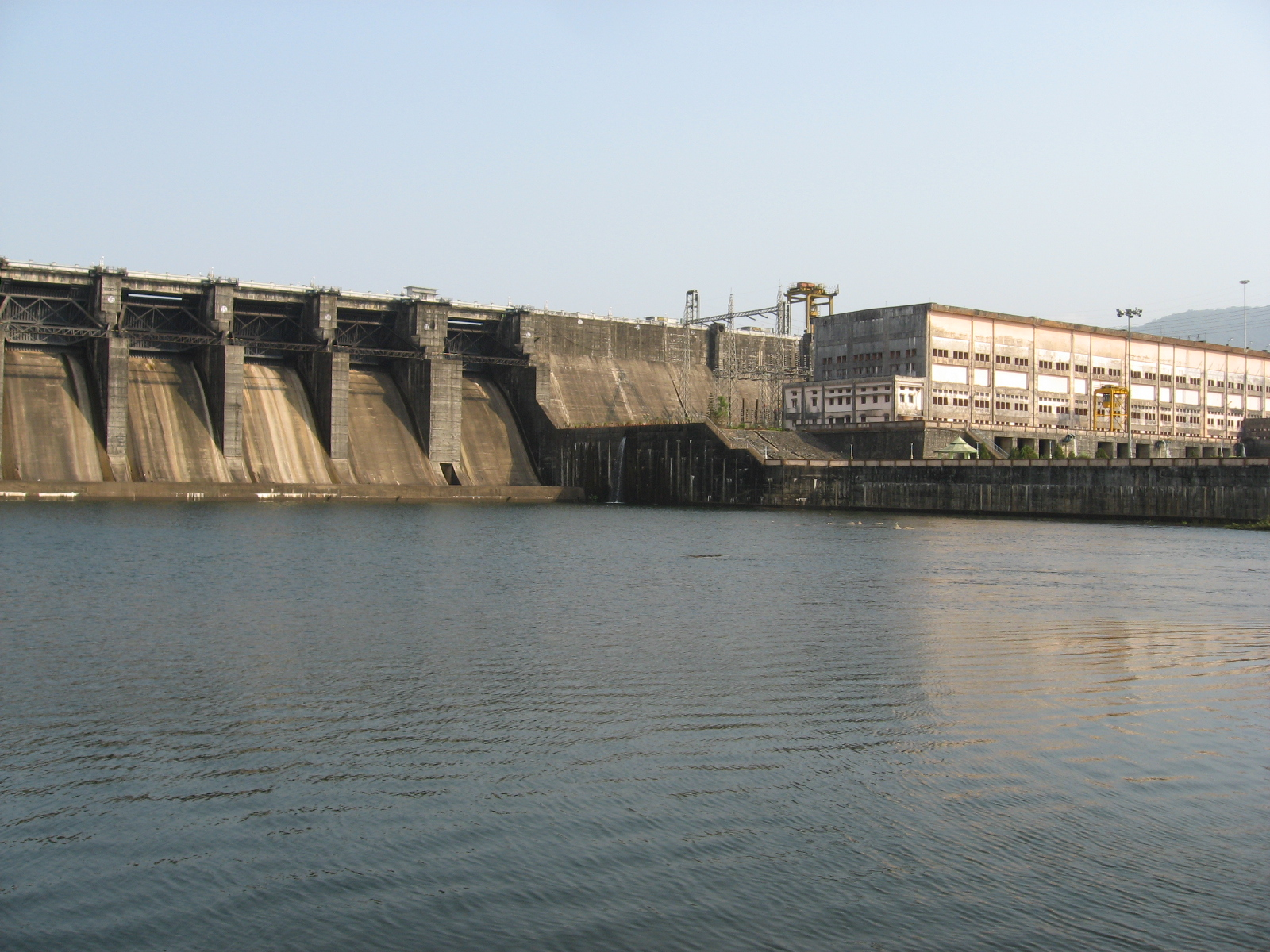
Kodasalli Dam and Power House

Kodasalli Dam is built across the Kali River (Kalinadi) in Yellapura taluk of Uttara Kannada district of Karnataka state, India.

This dam was built by Karnataka Power Corporation Limited (KPCL). This electric power generating station is classified as hydroelectric power station. It also is a major source of irrigation. The Kali Hydro Electric project, the first to be executed by KPCL, has five dams and four power houses with an installed capacity of 1,225 MW.

The Rural crop production in Yellapura is completely dependent on the water of Kodasalli Dam. it is a major source of water for farming and other related works.

In Karnataka, the Kali River has been designated as National Waterway 52, spanning 53 kilometres from Kodasalli dam to Sadashivagad bridge.
