= Kali River (Karnataka) =

River in Karnataka, India

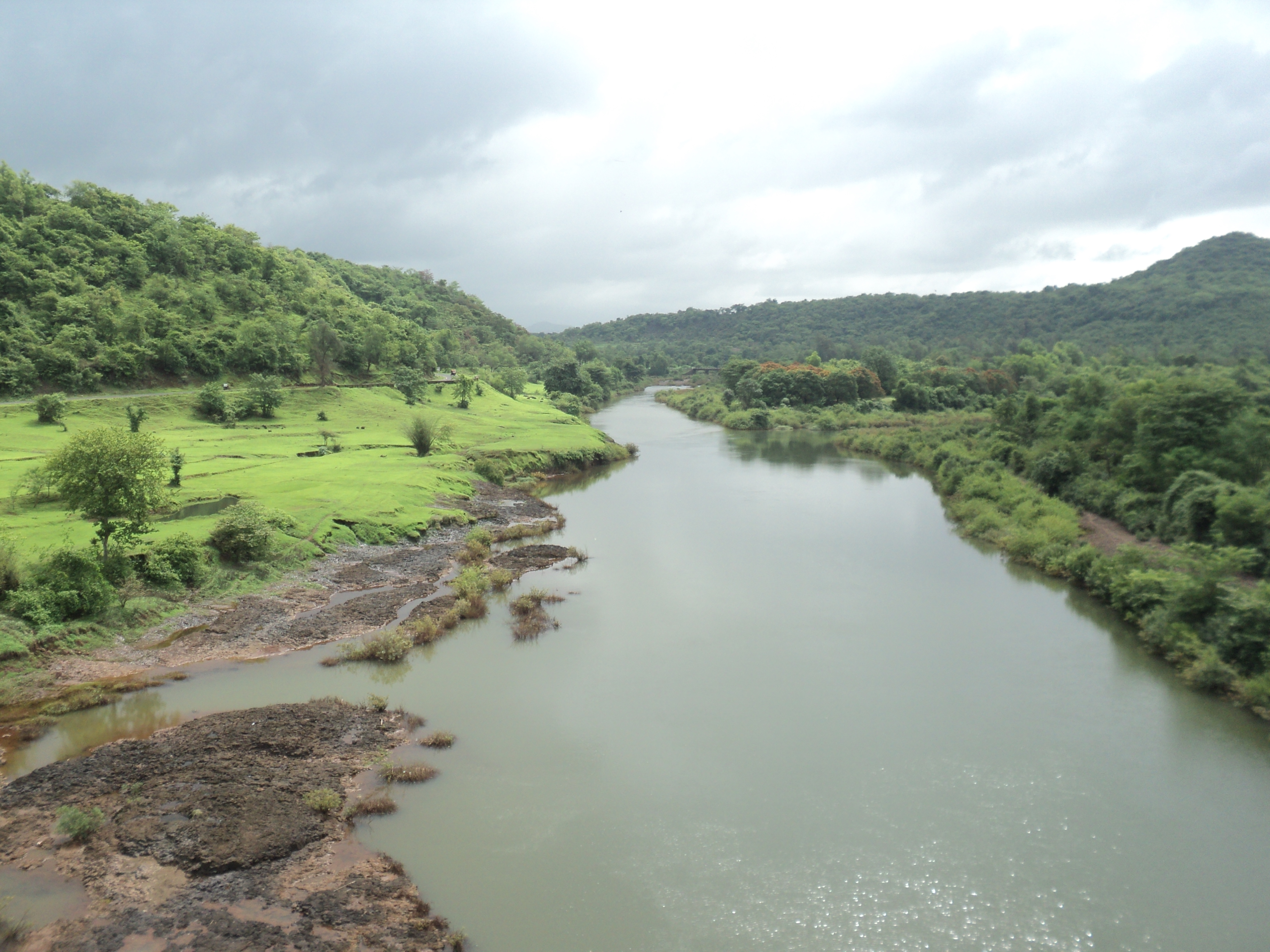

Location
- Country: India
- State: Karnataka
- District: Uttara Kannada

Physical characteristics
- Source: Diggi village, Karnataka
  - location: Joida taluk
- Mouth: Arabian Sea
  - location: Karwar
- Length: 184 km (114 mi)
- Discharge
  - location: Karwar, India
  - average: 152 m^{3}/s (5,400 cu ft/s)

Kali River and Sadashivgad Fort as seen from Nandangadda Village

The Kali River , also known as Kalinadi, is a river flowing through the Uttara Kannada district of Karnataka state in India. The river rises near Kushavali, a village in Uttar Kannada district, and empties into the Arabian Sea near Karwar, with a reported length of 184 kilometers.

There are six dams across this river used for electricity generation. One of the major dams across the river is the Supa Dam at Ganeshgudi. The Kaiga Atomic Power Station is also built next to the river. It is one of the world's only nuclear sites in a forest. The river also flows through Kali Tiger Reserve in the Western Ghats.

The National Highway NH-17 continues on the Kali Bridge built over Kali River and the road continues to split the Sadashivgad granite rock hill to connect Karnataka to Goa.

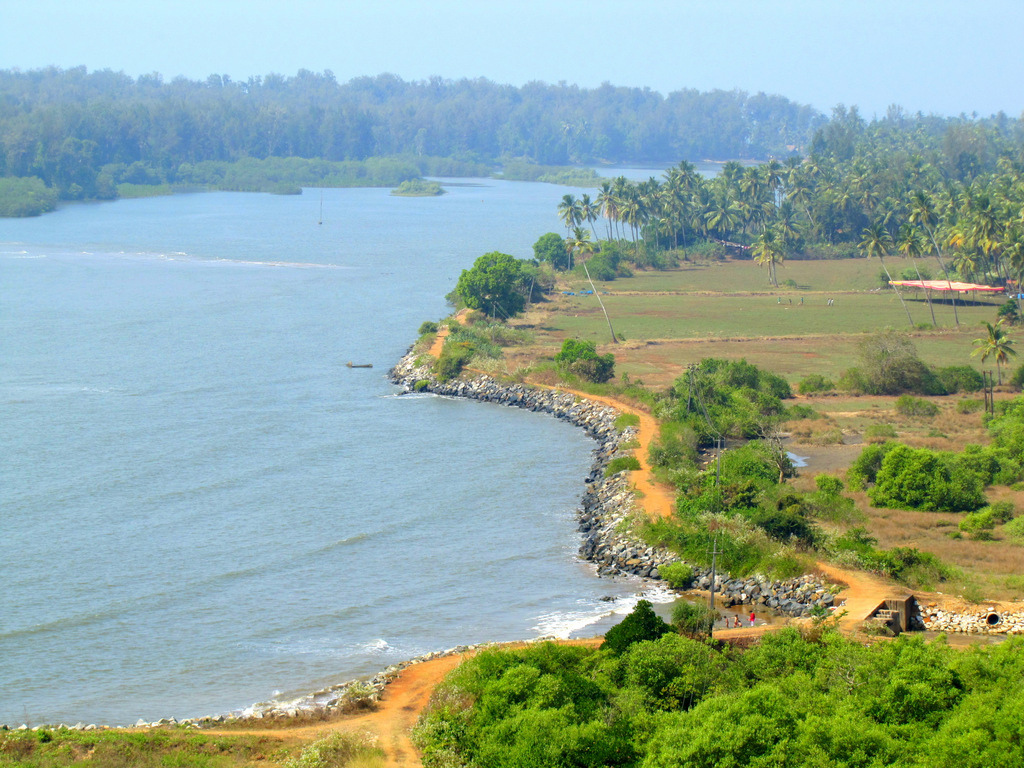
A view of Kali River

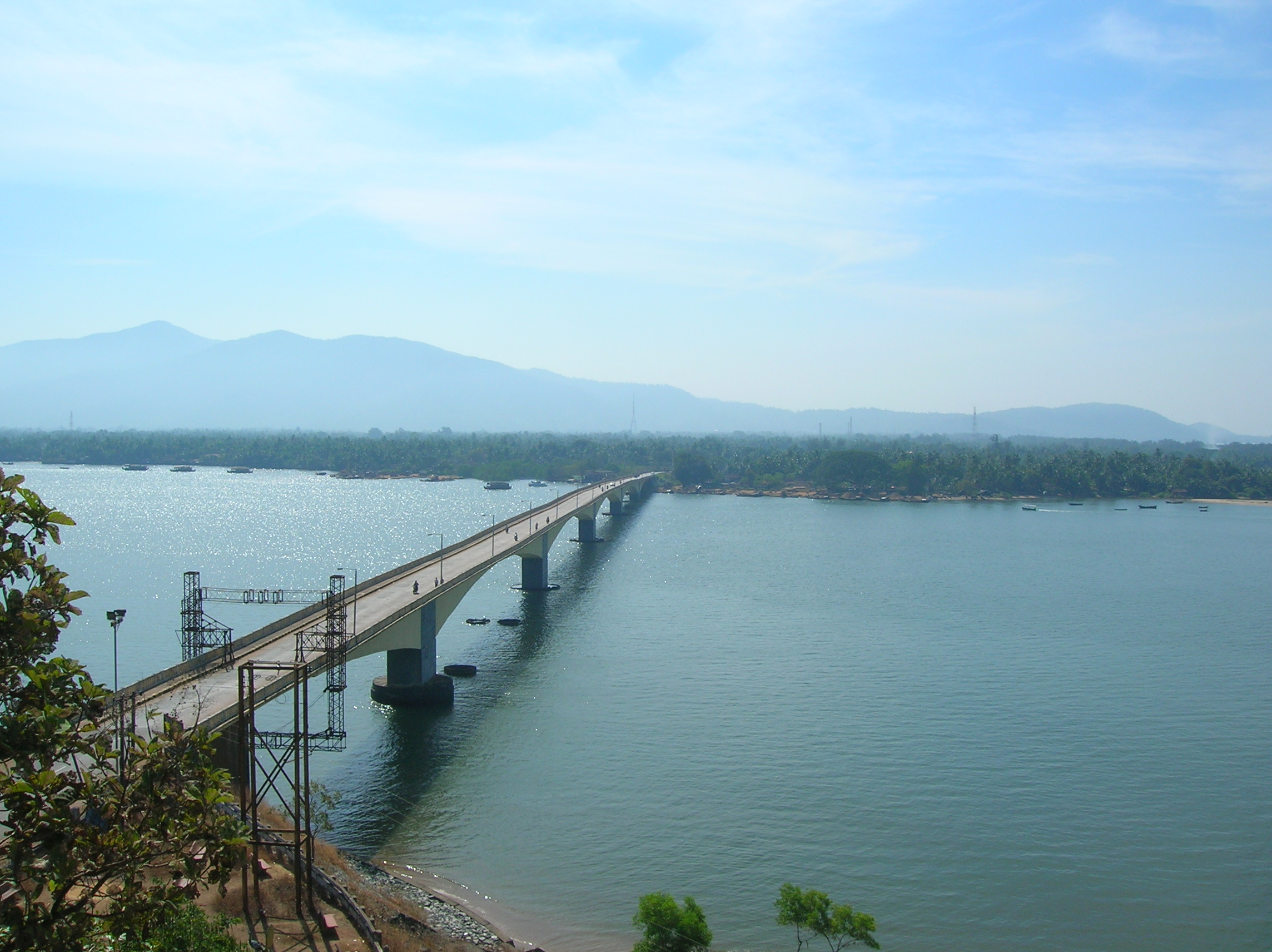
View of Kali river and the bridge from Sadashivgad Fort.

== Etymology ==
There are two possible origins for the river's name: it could be named for the goddess Kali, and also for its black colour; "Kali" meaning black in both Hindi and Kannada. The river's black colour is caused by its manganese-rich bed.

== Origin and course ==
The Kali River originates near the village of Kushavali of Joida Taluka, 15°14′56″N 074°17′58″E, in the Western Ghats and flows eastwards into the Supa Dam Reservoir, where it is joined by the Pandri River from the left (north). The Kali exits at Supa Dam near Kurandi then flows east towards Dandeli. Passing south of Dandeli, the Kali River flows southeast into the Bommanalli Reservoir, exiting at the dam and flowing east between the villages of Kegdal on the right (south) and Bommanalli on the left (north). After the village of Bommanalli the Kali turns south and at 15°05′21″N 074°43′57″E is joined by the Tattihalla River from the left (west). At that point the Kali turns west and flows through a gorge which ends at Sathodi Falls below Sykes Point. The Kali is then joined by the Kaneri River from the right (north) at 15°03′52″N 074°36′17″E, and flows south-southwest into Kodasalli Reservoir. Leaving that reservoir, the Kali River flows west and is joined by the Vuki Halla from the right (north). Whence it flows southwest into the Kadra Reservoir, and is joined by the Thana Halla just below the dam at Kadra. From Kadra, the Kali flows west through marshland to join the Arabian Sea near the town of Karwar. The river flows entirely through the district of Uttara Kannada.

== Ecology ==
Flowing through the Western Ghats, the river is rich in minerals, particularly manganese. This gives the river its blackish appearance. The regions bordering the river are biodiversity-rich, containing tropical evergeen, semi-evergreen and moist deciduous forests.

== Environmental issues ==
Despite a National Green Tribunal order ordering the halt of sand mining in Coastal Regulation Zone (CRZ) areas, illegal sand mining continues along the river. Release of industrial effluents and illegal sand mining have resulted in disturbances to the river's ecology. The government's efforts to control the pollution from illegal sand mining have had limited success. Effluents from paper mills and poultry waste have drawn crocodiles to the riverbank near Dandeli, with several crocodile attacks reported.

The construction of dams on the river have been found to be a leading cause of loss of tree cover in the Uttara Kannada region, along with power projects and encroachment of land for horticulture and agriculture.

In October 2026, the Karnataka Forest Department led removed 1,825 kg of solid waste at the river basin in Karwar. The waste collected included plastic and glass waste, discarded fishing nets, diapers, sanitary napkins, rubber materials and other solid waste dumped along the coast.

In July 2026, the government of India removed the Kali river from its polluted rivers list.

== Tourism ==
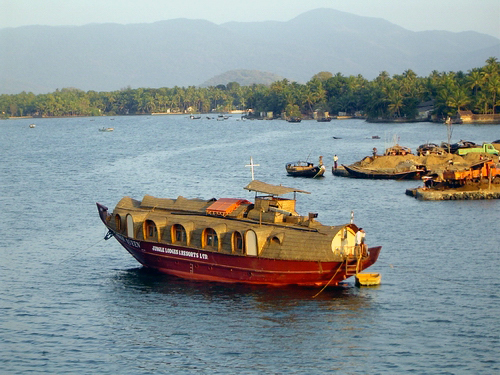
Leisure boats on Kali River

Sections of the river near Dandeli have become popular for whitewater rafting, kayaking, canoeing and boating. The first Kayaking Festival was held by the government in 2017. Opening up ecotourism operation to private operators has led to concerns of irresponsible tourism and disturbances to the surrounding ecosystem. The rafting route flows through a hornbill conservation zone and other sensitive habitats.

The Sadashivgad Fort is a popular tourist destination near the coastal highway at the Kali river bridge, built above the confluence of the river and the Arabian Sea.

== Media ==
Sarkaar Ki Duniya, and Indian reality show that airs on Real TV, was shot at Mango Island near Ambe Joog, an island surrounded by the Kali river in Siddar near Karwar.

== See also ==
- List of dams and reservoirs in India
- List of rivers of India
- Karwar
- Dandeli
- Supa Dam
- Kali Tiger Reserve
