= Karwar =

City in Karnataka, India

Karwar Carwar, Koney
- Municipality /Taluk
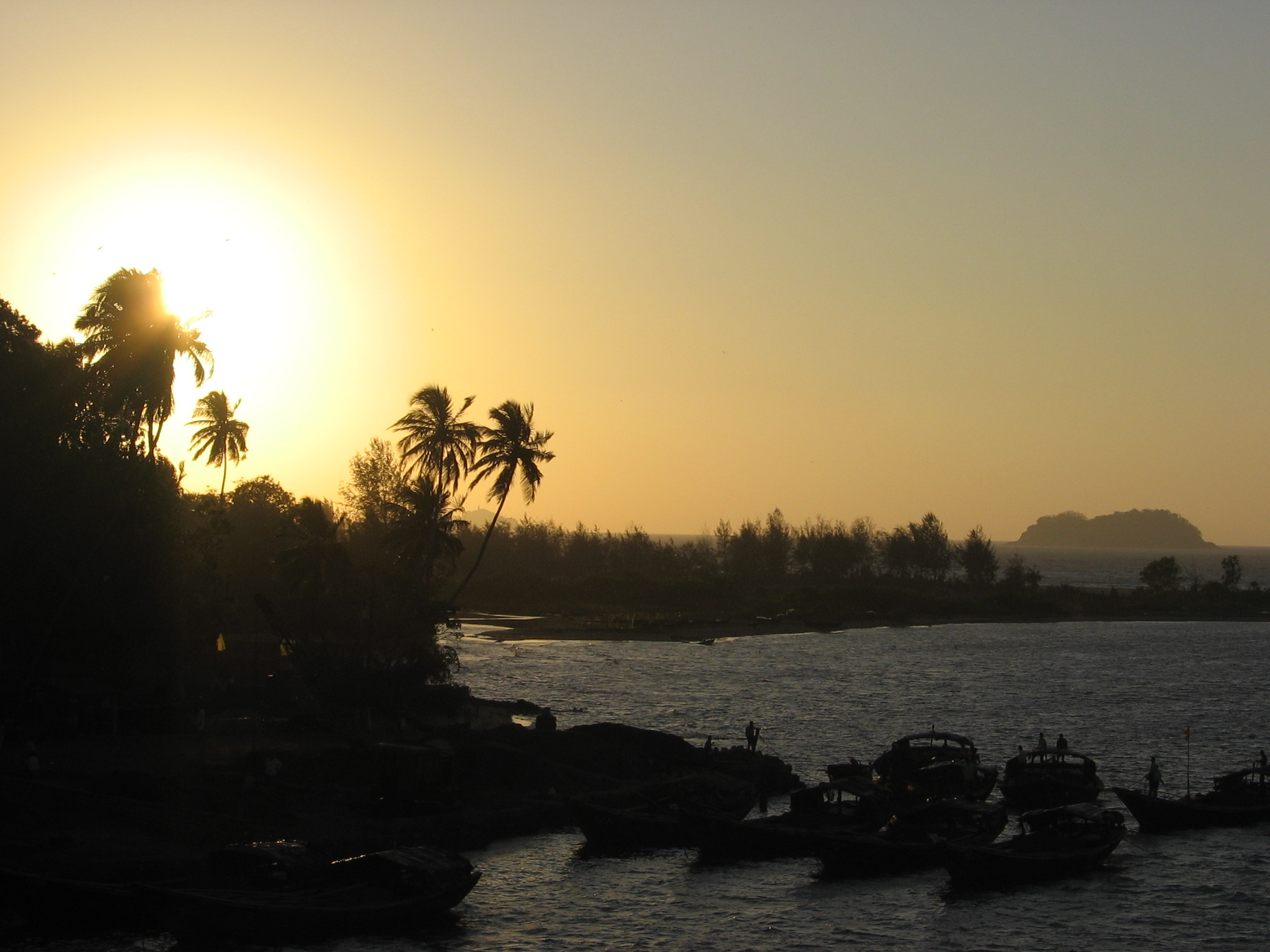
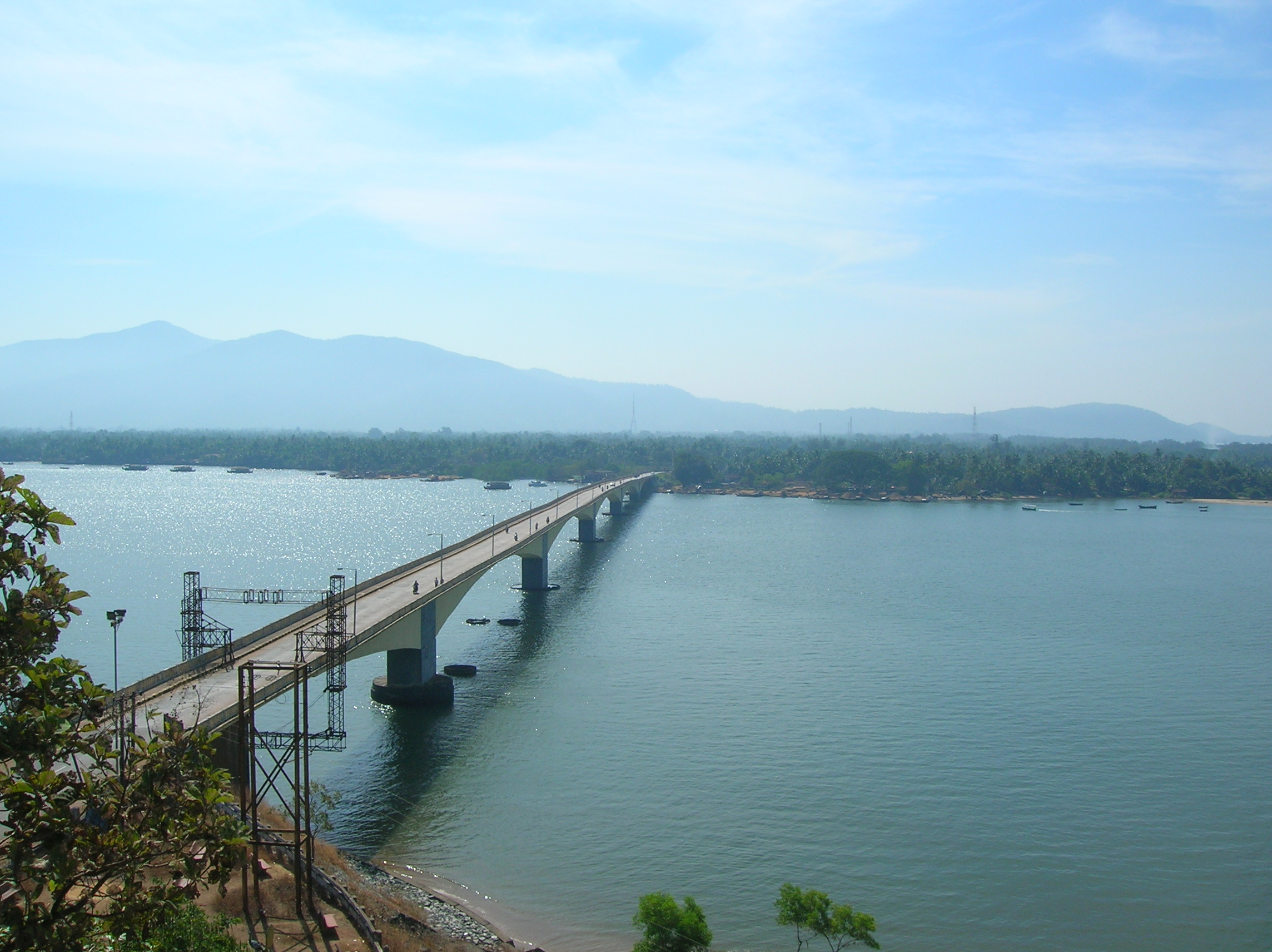
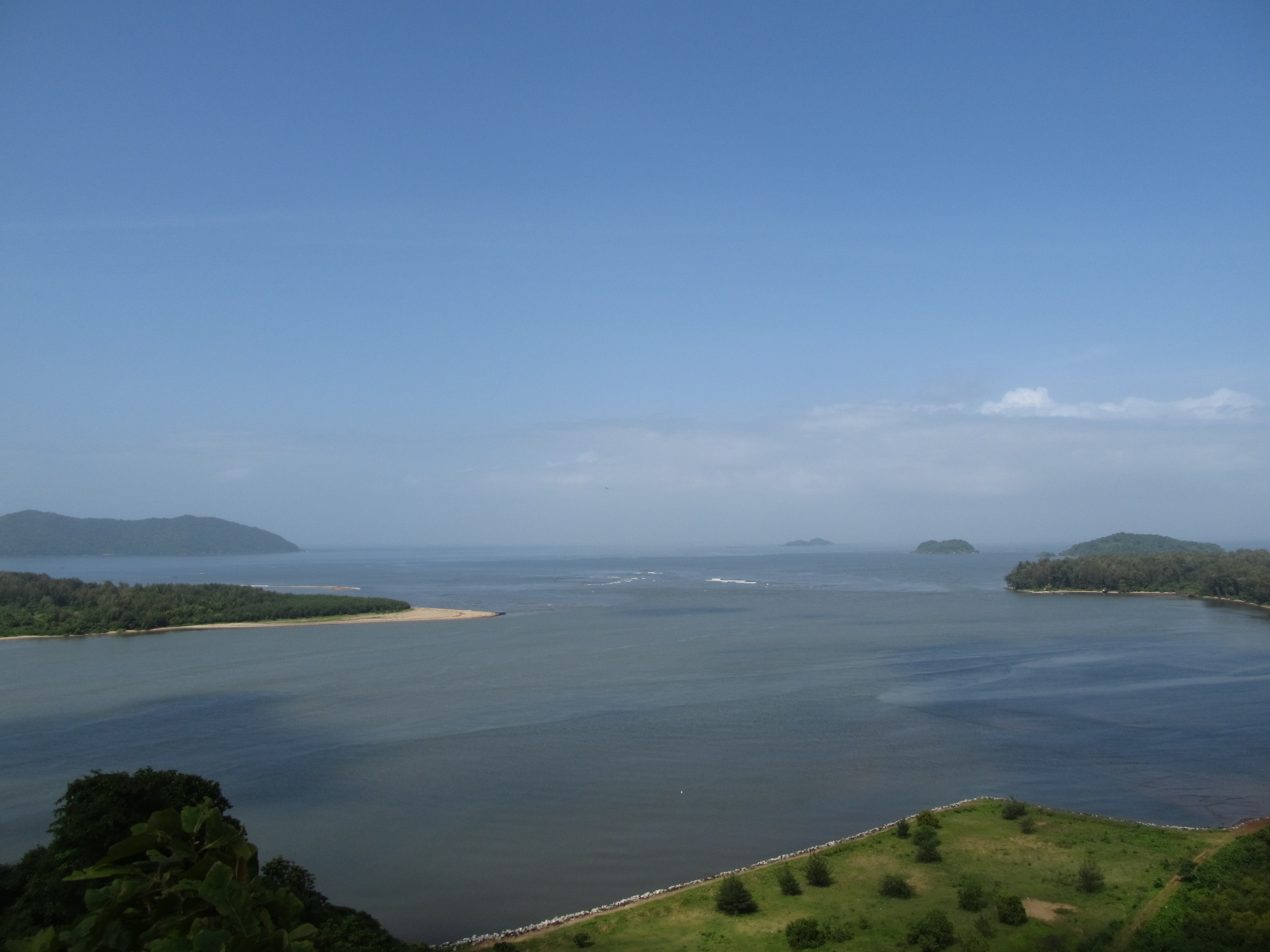
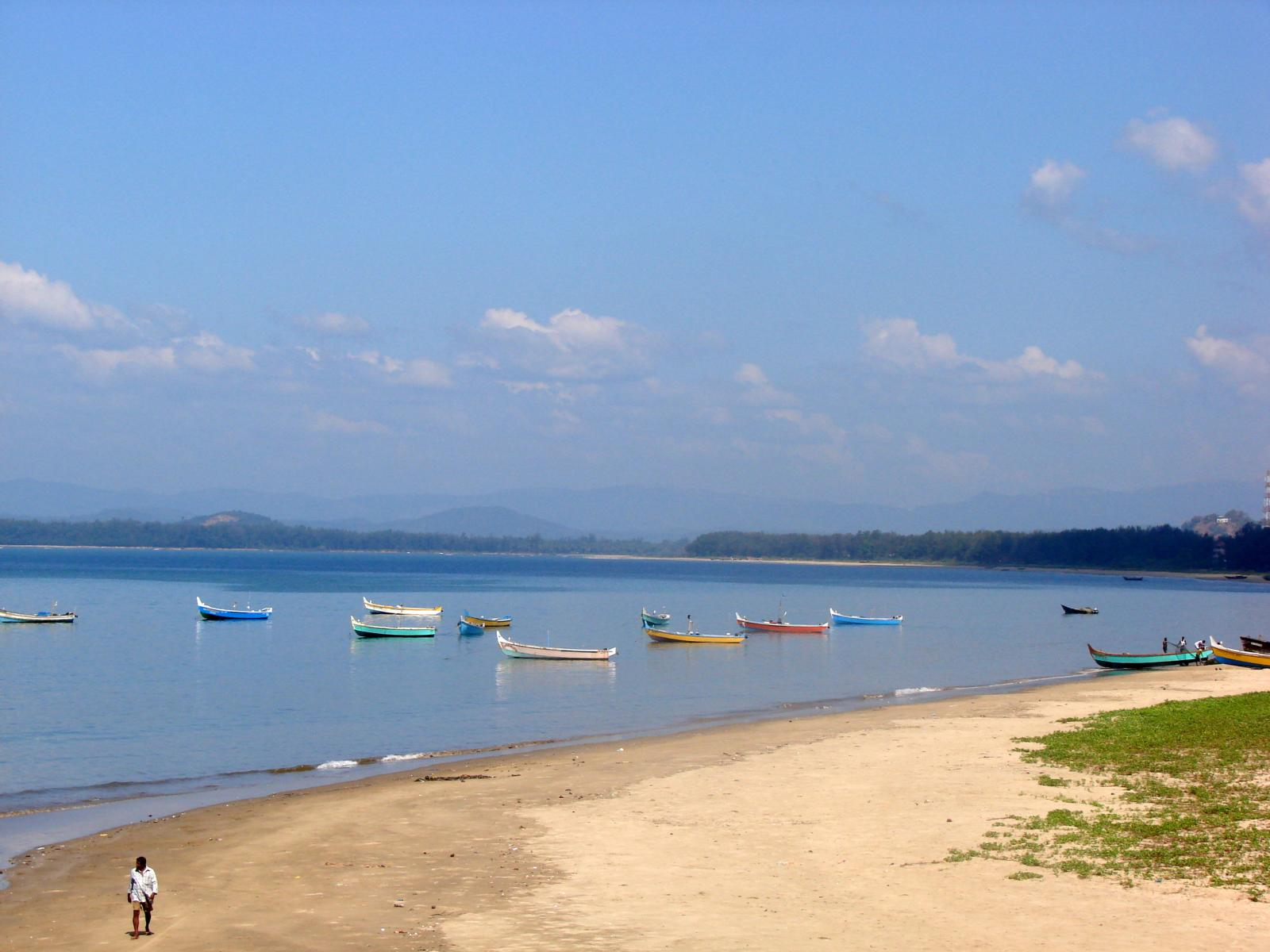
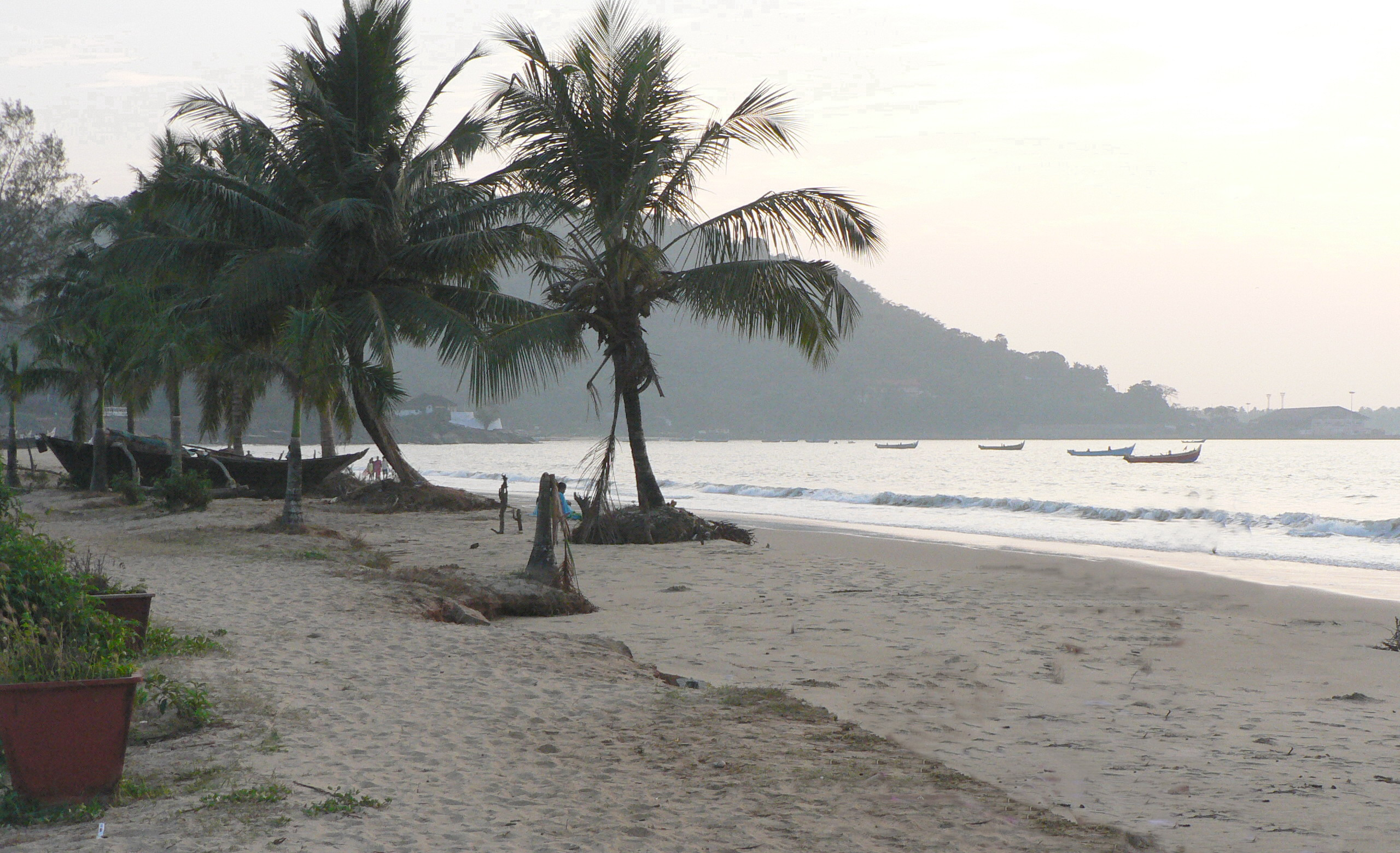
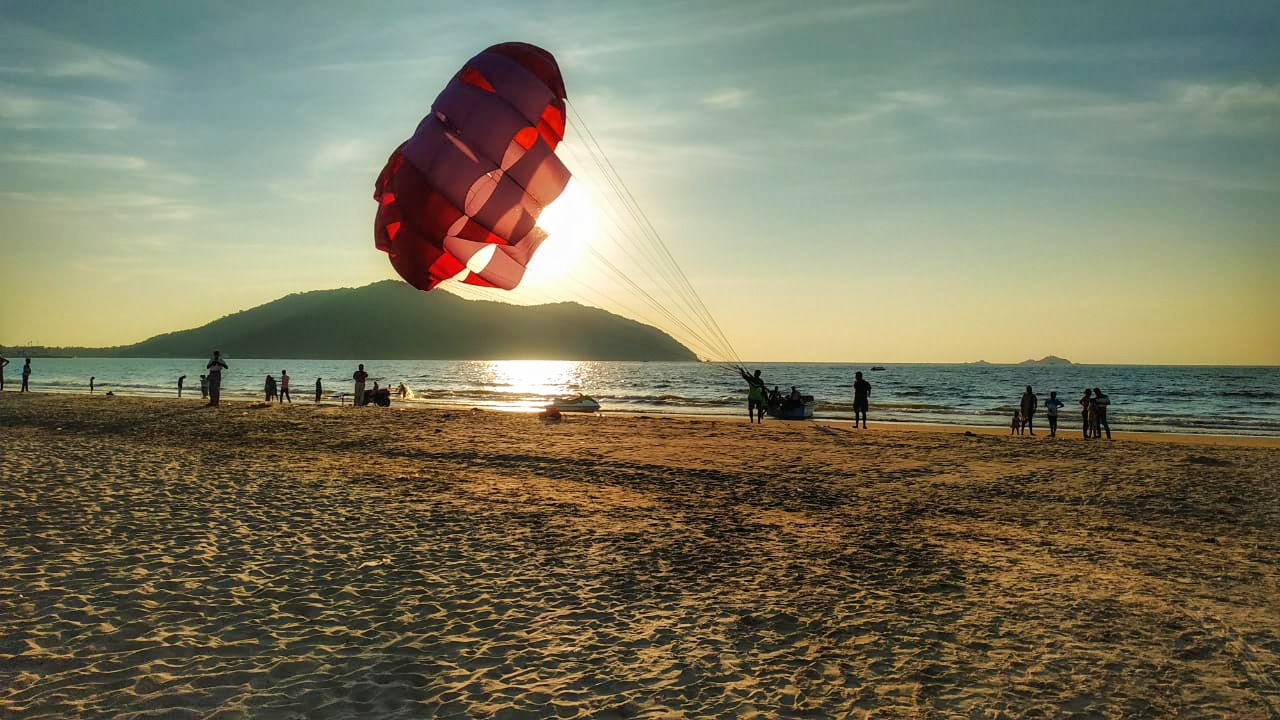
- Clockwise from the Top: Tagore Beach, Arabian Sea from Sadashivgad fort, Majali Beach, Bridge over Kali River, Rabindranath Tagore Beach
- Interactive map of Karwar
- Coordinates: 14.80°N 74.13°E
- Country: India
- State: Karnataka
- District: Uttara Kannada
- Established: 1867

Government
  - Type: City Municipal Council

Area
  - Urban: 36.95 km^{2} (14.27 sq mi)
  - Taluk: 743.4 km^{2} (287.0 sq mi)
- Elevation: 6 m (20 ft)

Population (2011)
  - CMC+Outgrowth: 77,139
  - Taluk: 155,213
- Demonym: Karwarkar
- Time zone: UTC+5:30 (IST)
- PIN: 581301
- Telephone code: 91-8382
- Vehicle registration: KA 30
- Official language: Kannada
- Regional language: Konkani
- HDI (2014): ▲0.900 (Very High)
- Literacy (2014): 89.91
- Sex ratio (2014): 989 ♀/1000 ♂
- Website: karwarcity.mrc.gov.in

Karwar is a coastal city, taluka and the administrative headquarters of Uttara Kannada district, formerly part of the Bombay Presidency, located at the mouth of the Kali river along the Konkan Coast in the present-day state of Karnataka, India.

== Etymology ==
Karwar, also known locally as "Kādwād", derived its name from the nearby village of "Kade-Wādā". In the local Konkani, Kade means "Last" and Wādā means "Ward". Hence, Kade-Wādā ("the last neighbourhood") referred to the southernmost Konkani-speaking village. During the Crown rule in India, the name "Karwar" was spelt as "Carwar". The ancient name was "Baithkhol"—from an Arabic term Bait-e-kol— meaning the "bay of safety". This is in the Indian history for maritime trade wherein black peppercorns, cardamom, and muslin cloth were exported from this Kādwād port and after the war with Veer Henja Naik (1803), the port activities were shifted to Baithkhol. Thereafter, the port of Kādwād was isolated and Kurmagad Fort was activated by the Portuguese.

== History ==
Kali River and Sadashivgad fort

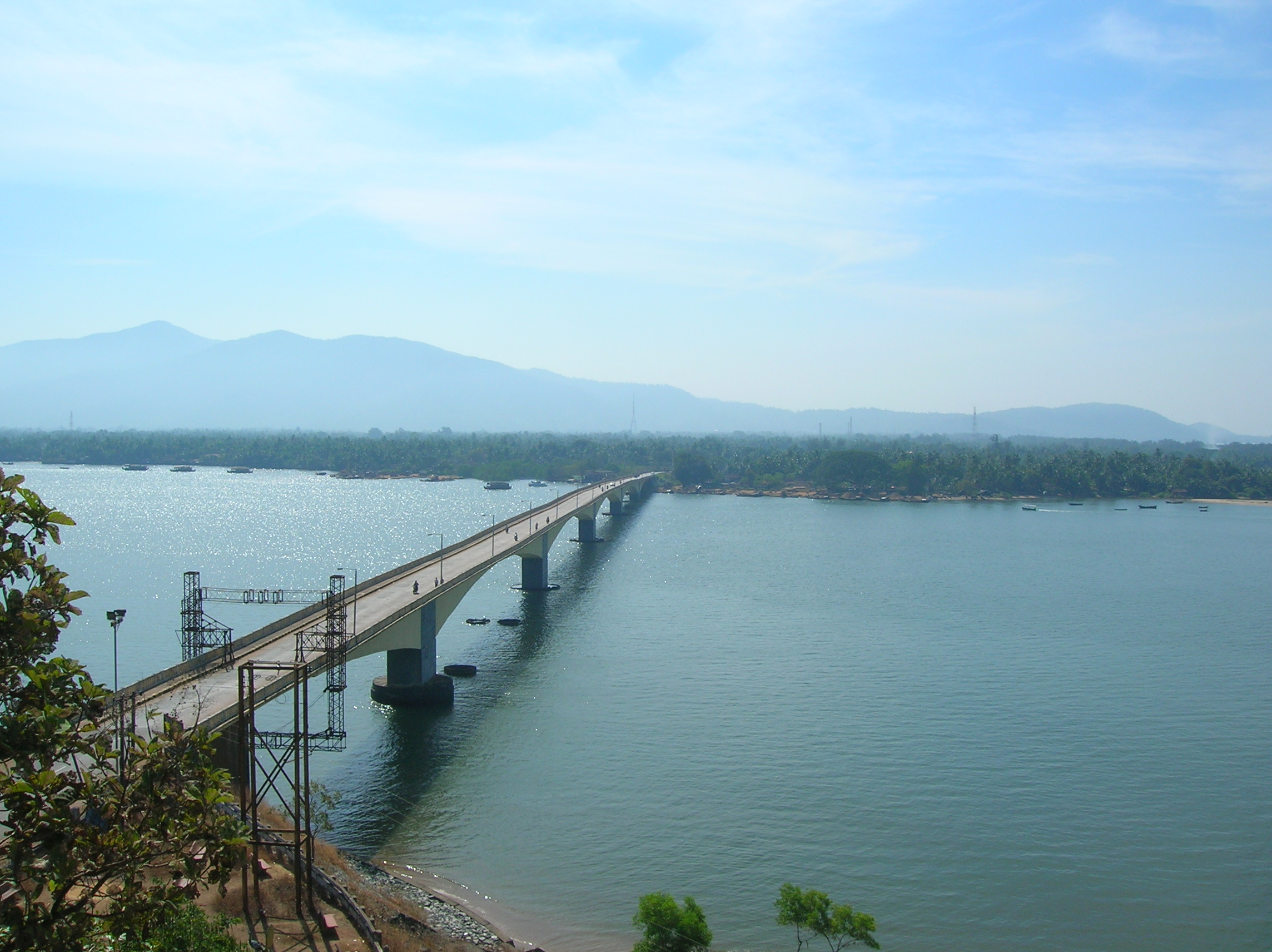
Kali river bridge, Karwar

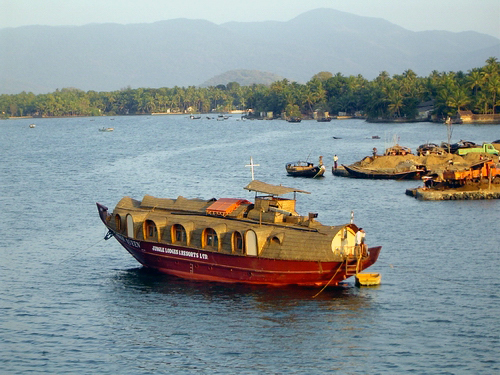
Leisure boats on Kali River

Karwar township was built by the British in the year 1857 after the Indian Rebellion. Karwar is popularly known as the "Kashmir of Karnataka". Prior to 1857, Karwar did not exist as a town. Honnavara was the district headquarters of Canara district consisting up to Mangaluru to Kodibag Karwar, up till Kali river; and Karwar village (Kādwād) existed as hamlets like Habbuwada, Kajubag, Kodibag, Kone, Baad, Kathinkon, Sunkeri, Shirwad, and Binaga. After that, the river bank towards the north was under the rule of Sadhashiv Nayak and Maratha Confederacy. After the mutiny of 1857, the British made division of Canara District into two parts as South Canara with headquarters at Mangaluru attached to Madras Presidency and North Canara with headquarters at the newly built town Karwar, which was attached to Bombay Presidency. It was a planned city like Panaji, Mumbai, Dharwad, and Bengaluru. After the rule of the Indian Government from 1947, Karwar is more or less neglected politically and kept without major developments.

=== Ancient history ===
The region of Karwar was historically part of the ancient city of Govapuri, as documented in the Sahyadrikhanda of the Skanda Purana:

गोकर्णादुत्तरे भागे सप्तयोजनविस्तृ॥

तत्र गोवापुरी नाम नगरी पापनाशिनी॥

(Translation: "To the north of Gokarna, extending over seven yojanas, lies the city of Govapuri, the destroyer of sins.")

This revered reference underscores Karwar's deep historical and mythological ties to the Konkan region, intertwining it with Goa's cultural and spiritual heritage.

In later centuries, Portuguese traders knew Karwar as Cintacora, Chitrakul, Chittakula or Sindpur. In 1510, the Portuguese captured and burnt a fort at Karwar. They called it Fort Pir, Forte de Piro or Pito due to the presence of a Muslim Dargah (tomb of a Sufi saint, Shahkaramuddin).

In 1638, the English Trading Courteen Association established a factory at Kadwad village, 6 km east of Karwar and traded with merchants from Arabia and Africa. The common commodities were muslin, black pepper, cardamom, cassier and coarse blue cotton cloth. In 1649, the Courteen Association merged with the British East India Company, and Karwar became a company town. The East India Company built fighting ships in the Karwar harbour. For example, the Britannia (1715) which had 18 guns was built to defend Bombay from attacks by Maratha Koli admiral Kanhoji Angre.

Before the Portuguese colonization, the area was part of several Indian kingdoms, including those that encompassed present-day Goa. Karwar shares notable cultural similarities with Goa, particularly in its language and cuisine.

In the 1700s, Karwar was a part of the Maratha Empire. Having marched from Bednore in the south, visiting on his way the sacred temple at Gokarna, Shivaji seized Ankola and the next day came to Karwar (then known as Kadwad). Both the East India Company and Sher Shah, the Sardar of Bijapur, were very much alarmed at this sudden development. They collected a huge amount and offered it to Shivaji, praying that they may be spared. Satisfied at the recognition of his authority, Shivaji crossed the Kali River and conquered Sadashivgad on 21 February 1665.

In 1784, at the time of the Treaty of Mangaluru between Tipu Sultan and the East India Company, After the defeat of the Marathas in the Third Anglo-Maratha War, Karwar was captured by the British. Kot Siveshvar, another fortress, was built near Karwar (in Siveshvar village) by the Sultan of Bijapur to counterattacks from the north. Karwar is also believed to be the coast where Ottomans arrived at the request of Tipu Sultan as aide in battle against the British empire. The said Ottoman aid could not participate in any battles due to martyrdom of Tipu Sultan but instead set up a stronghold with the locals and later the Portuguese and Marathas to protect the town.

At the ruins of Fort Siveshvar are a Muslim graveyard and a tunnel at the eastern gate. The Bengali poet and Nobel laureate Rabindranath Tagore, who visited Karwar in 1882, dedicated a chapter of his memoirs to this town. At 22 years old, Tagore stayed with his second brother, Satyendranath Tagore, who was a district judge in Karwar.

From 1862 until the re-organization of the Indian states after Independence, present-day Uttara Kannada district was a part of the Bombay Presidency. During this period, major public works carried out included the improvement of roads, the building of a wharf, wharf road and a sea wall at the Karwar port as well as the construction of a multi-floor storage building, staff housing, a post office, kutcheri (kutcherries or zamindar's offices) and a Christian burial ground. At the same time, the local Konkani-speaking people had close connections with Mumbai and Goa. Many Marathi middle schools were established in Karwar and Joida taluks, despite the fact that the local populace mostly were Konkani native speakers.

During World War II Karwar was an Indian Naval training site.

=== Post-Independence ===
After India gained independence in 1947, the movement for linguistic states led to the reorganization of states based on language. In 1956, the Mysore State was formed, incorporating various regions, including parts of the Bombay Presidency. Despite Karwar being a Konkani-speaking region, it was included in the newly formed Mysore State as part of this reorganization. Since Goa was under Portuguese control at the time, forming a Konkani-speaking state was not feasible. The decision to incorporate Karwar into Mysore State was influenced by broader political and administrative considerations aimed at creating a cohesive Kannada-speaking state. Karwar during the 1950–60s played important role in the Konkani language agitation, helping cement Konkani as an independent language during Konkani conferences held in Karwar. The city played an important role in Konkan culture and Konkani culture hosting many Konkani conferences to promote the language. There have been demographic shifts since the state reorganizations act, and Karwar is no longer the stronghold for Konkani culture and has been overtaken by Panaji (or Panjim), Goa (after Goa achieved statehood) and by Mangaluru.

The city is also neglected by the state government and has been devoid of development in recent years. Spots of attractions are usually underfunded, relatively little money is allowed for development and people have to constantly rely on the neighboring state of Goa to carry out their needs.

== Geography ==
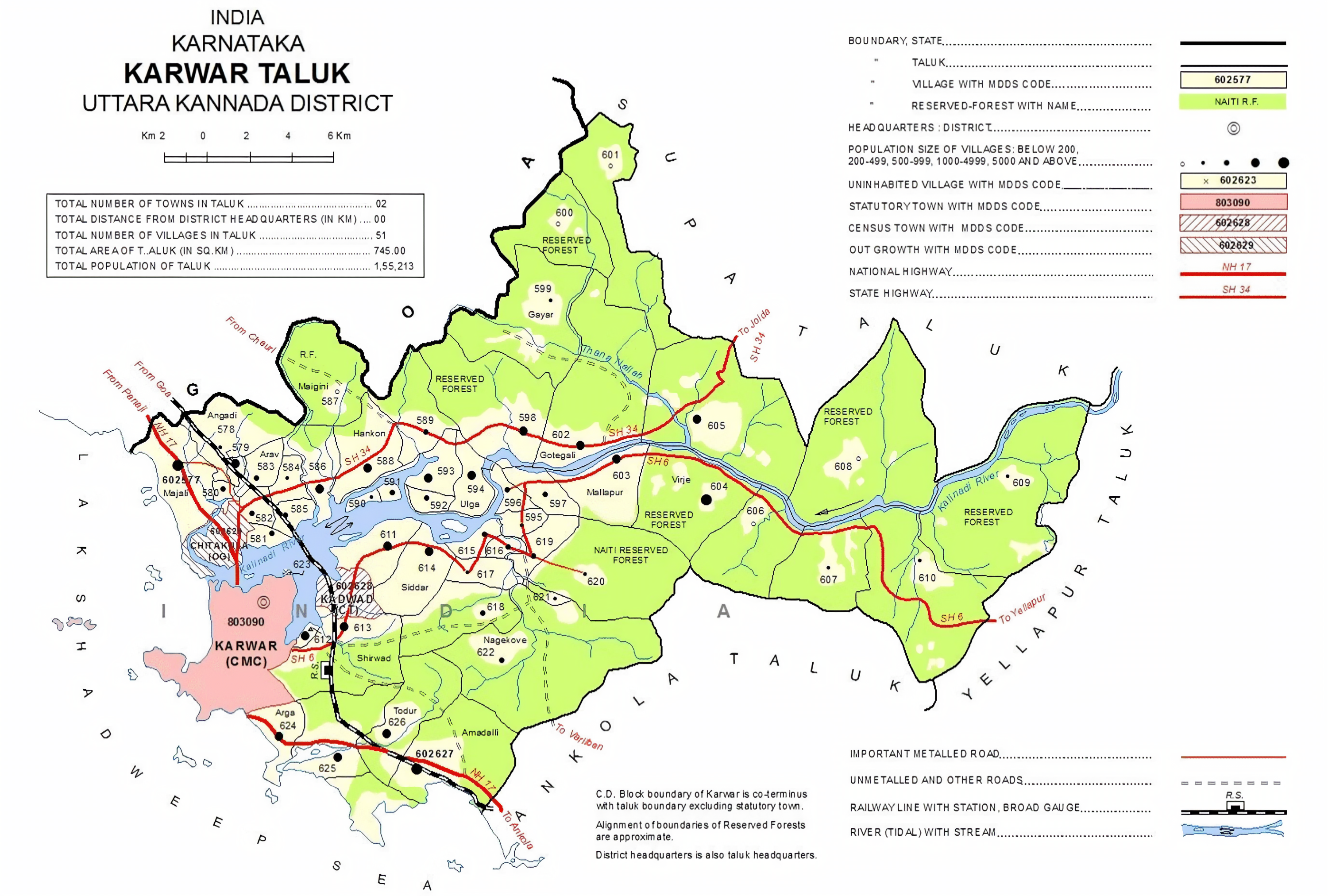
Map of Karwar Taluk

Karwar is a seaport on the west coast of peninsular India. To the east are the Western Ghats. Karwar is situated on the banks of the Kali river which flows west to the Arabian sea from its headwaters at Bidi village in the Western Ghats. The Kali river has a length of about 150 km (93 mi) and is the main source of irrigation in the region.

Baitkhol port at Karwar is a natural harbour with land side hills and ocean side islands protecting it from cyclonic weather. The four fathom mark lies close to the shore. The tidal range is 1.5–2.5 m (5–8 ft).

=== Biodiversity ===
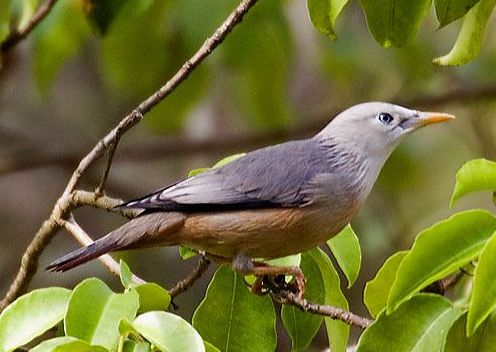
Local bird, Sturnia blythii. Karwar is rich in flora and fauna

Several small mangrove covered islands lie off the Kali river estuary including Anjediva Island and Devagadaguda Islands. The sub-tidal regions of the islands have a high biodiversity, although the waters off Karwar have recorded higher than normal faecal coliform counts.

=== Climate ===
Karwar lies on a coastal strip known as the Monsoon Coast. Karwar has hot and humid summers (27–34 °C (81–93 °F)) from March to May where the temperature may peak to 38 °C (100 °F). The Arabian Sea is warm throughout the year. Winters from December to February are mild (23–29 °C (73–84 °F)) and seldom plummet to 20 °C (68 °F). The windy monsoon period from June to September has an average rainfall of over 400 cm (160 in).

Climate data for Karwar (1991–2020, extremes 1901–2020)
Month	Jan	Feb	Mar	Apr	May	Jun	Jul	Aug	Sep	Oct	Nov	Dec	Year
Record high °C (°F)	38.4 (101.1)	39.1 (102.4)	39.6 (103.3)	38.9 (102.0)	37.4 (99.3)	36.6 (97.9)	34.0 (93.2)	33.4 (92.1)	34.0 (93.2)	39.4 (102.9)	37.8 (100.0)	37.6 (99.7)	39.6 (103.3)
Mean daily maximum °C (°F)	33.5 (92.3)	33.4 (92.1)	33.6 (92.5)	34.3 (93.7)	34.4 (93.9)	31.1 (88.0)	29.8 (85.6)	30.0 (86.0)	30.6 (87.1)	32.4 (90.3)	34.3 (93.7)	34.0 (93.2)	32.6 (90.7)
Mean daily minimum °C (°F)	19.5 (67.1)	20.2 (68.4)	23.2 (73.8)	25.7 (78.3)	26.9 (80.4)	25.3 (77.5)	24.7 (76.5)	24.6 (76.3)	24.3 (75.7)	23.3 (73.9)	22.6 (72.7)	20.5 (68.9)	23.5 (74.3)
Record low °C (°F)	12.7 (54.9)	11.6 (52.9)	15.6 (60.1)	17.2 (63.0)	20.3 (68.5)	18.3 (64.9)	18.3 (64.9)	20.3 (68.5)	20.5 (68.9)	16.8 (62.2)	13.7 (56.7)	12.5 (54.5)	11.6 (52.9)
Average rainfall mm (inches)	0.2 (0.01)	0.1 (0.00)	1.2 (0.05)	12.1 (0.48)	107.9 (4.25)	984.5 (38.76)	993.9 (39.13)	618.1 (24.33)	333.4 (13.13)	201.4 (7.93)	21.1 (0.83)	5.2 (0.20)	3,279.1 (129.10)
Average rainy days	0.1	0.0	0.1	0.8	4.1	22.7	27.4	23.7	14.5	7.8	1.7	0.4	103.3
Average relative humidity (%) (at 17:30 IST)	59	62	66	67	70	83	86	86	82	76	65	59	72
Source: India Meteorological Department

== Demographics ==
The total population in Karwar town with outgrowth is 77,139 as of 2011 by Indian Government. As of 2011, Karwar had an average literacy rate of 93%, higher than the national average of 74%. Males constitutes 49.7% of population and 50.3% are females. In Karwar, 10% of the population were children under six years of age.

Languages spoken as of 2011 in Karwar City.
1. Konkani (53.1%)
2. Kannada (30.5%)
3. Urdu (6.50%)
4. Hindi (3.35%)
5. Marathi (1.87%)
6. Others (4.65%)

=== Border issues ===
Karwar taluka is majorly Konkani by first language speakers. It was part of the Bombay Presidency during the British colonial rule, before the reorganization of states. The native Konkani speakers had close connections with Bombay which extended to matrimonial relations too. Many Marathi-medium schools were also established in Karwar and Joida talukas. Marathi films were often released in Karwar. The visit of Marathi drama troupes from Bombay and Poona(Pune) was an annual feature. However, Konkani-speaking people were disenchanted when Marathis began to claim Konkani as a dialect of Marathi. They disputed it and asserted that Konkani had independent status as a language. It was the native Konkani-speaking people led by late P. S. Kamat who argued before Mahajan Commission that Karwar was an integral part of Karnataka.

There have been recent assertions by both Maharashtra and Goa that Karwar should belong to their states.

== Religion ==
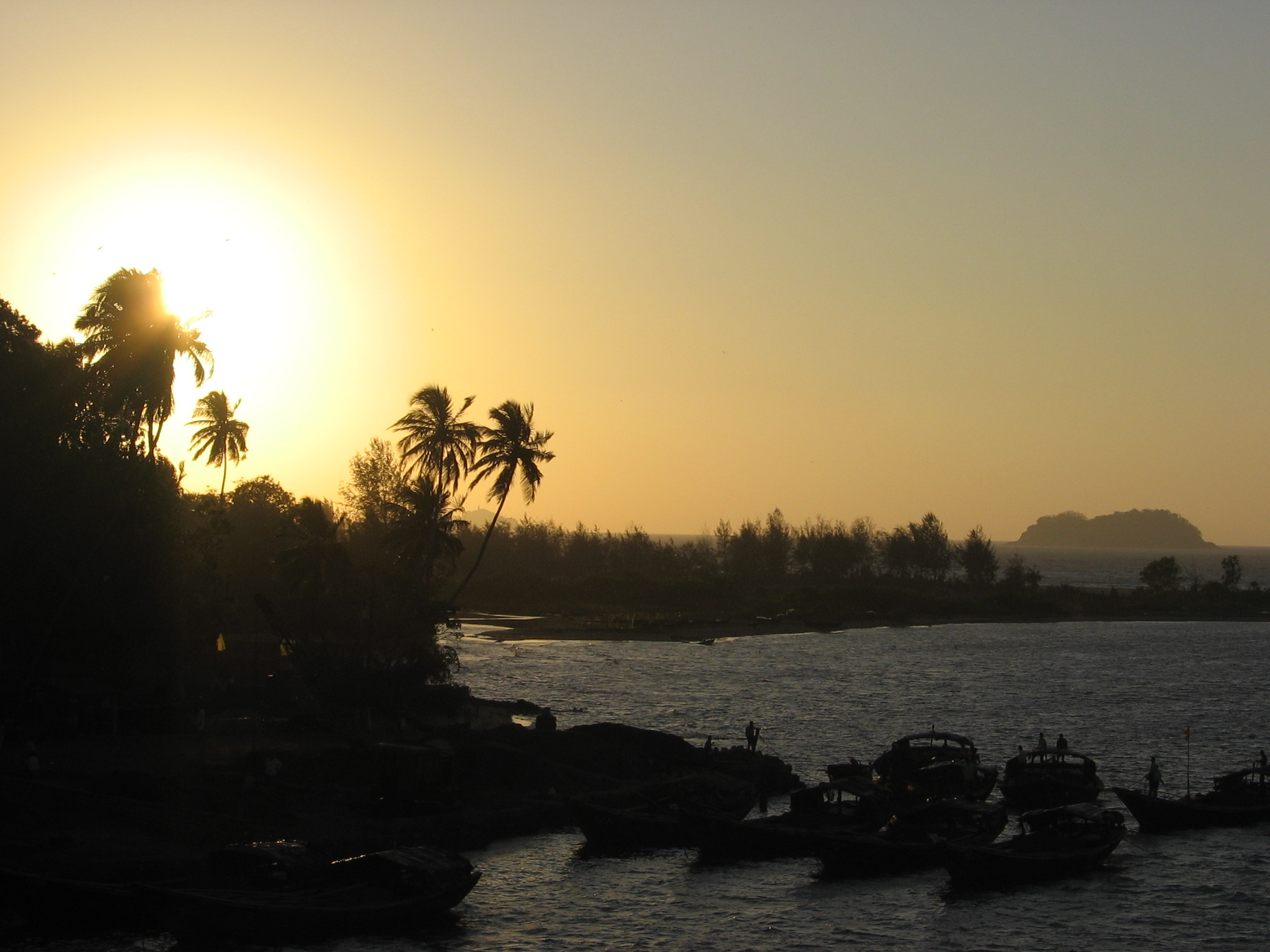
Sunset at Karwar bay

Karwar is and has primarily been Hindu. Christianity was introduced to Karwar by the Portuguese while ruling Goa in the 16th and 17th centuries and contemporary Karwari Catholics are descendants of those early Christians. Muslim seafaring traders migrated to Karwar from the Deccan (Bahamani) kingdoms. Karwar was called Baithkol meaning the "house of safety" or Bait-e-kol meaning "place of safety" in Arabic.

== Industry ==
=== Primary industry ===
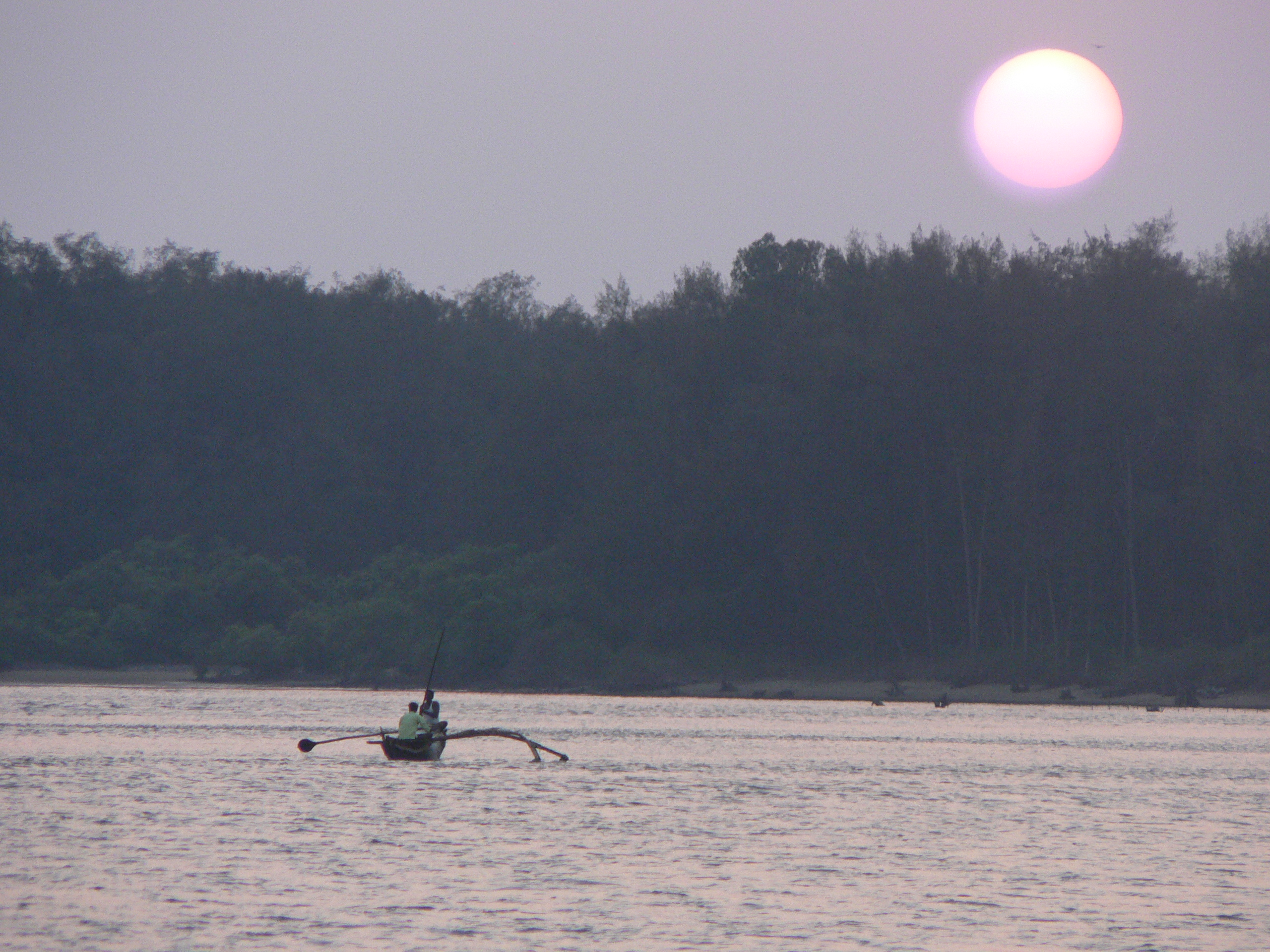
Fishermen returning home at sunset, Devbagh, Karwar

Karwar is an agricultural region. The common crops are rice, groundnuts, green vegetables, onions, watermelons, and flowers. Other primary industries include animal husbandry, sericulture, horticulture, beekeeping, prawns farming, gathering and lumbering and the growing of homeopathic medicinal plants.

The coastal location of Karwar lends to fishing and fisheries which are concentrated in Harikanth, Konkan Kharvis, Gabiths and Ambigas. The common types of fish are mackerel, sardines, crabs, clams, seerfish and prawns. Fishing is done from land with nets or from boats such as pandy (motor launch) and dhoni (dug out canoes). There is also mechanised trawling. The brackish water of the Kali estuary is suitable for prawn farming.

=== Secondary industry ===
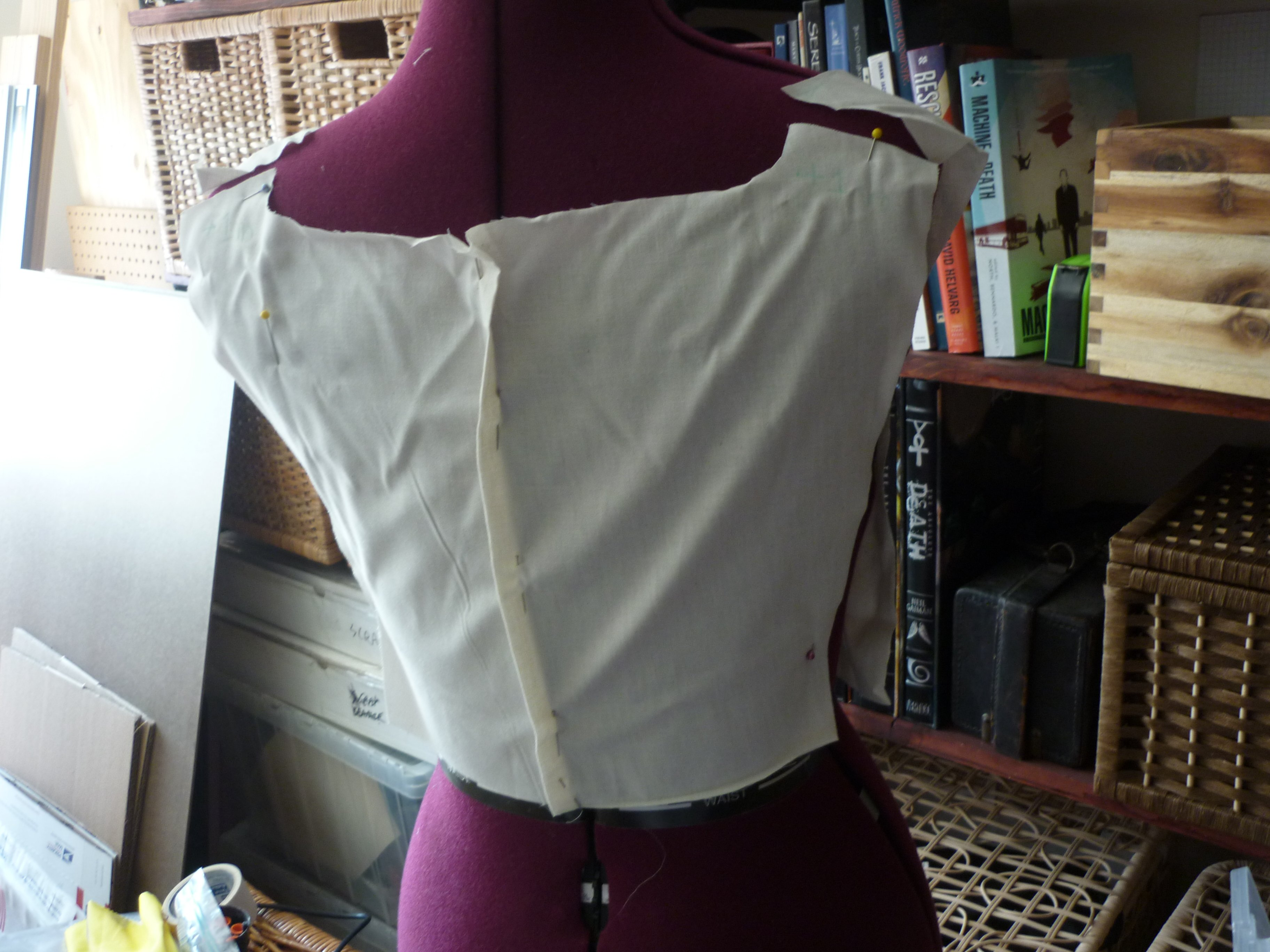
Muslin used in dress making

Members of the Daivadnya Brahmin caste are engaged in jewellery design, manufacturing and goldsmithing. Leather works are common. Since 1638, when William Counten opened a mill, Karwar town has been a producer of fine muslin. In the 1660s the factory was prosperous, exporting the finest muslins in Western India; the weaving country was inland to the east, at Hubli and other centres, where as many as 50,000 weavers were employed. Besides the great export of muslin, Karwar provided pepper, cardamoms, cassia, and coarse blue cotton cloth (dungan). I

In Binaga township, a chemical company Aditya Birla Chemicals (earlier owned by Ballarpur Industries Ltd / Solaris Chemtech), manufactures caustic soda lye and flakes, chlorine, hydrochloric acid, phosphoric acid, kestra pipes and bromine.

=== Tertiary industry ===
At Kaiga, 57.6 kilometres (35.8 mi) away, the Nuclear Power Corporation of India operates an 880 MW nuclear power plant. The Karnataka Power Corporation Ltd. operates a dam and 150 MW power house between Kadra and Mallapur townships, approximately 33 kilometres (21 mi) from Karwar town.

==== INS Kadamba ====
The Indian Navy operates a naval base at a bay near Binaga township. It is the navy's third largest base. The base was founded as part of Project Seabird. Casurina beach near Binaga (now called Kamat Bay) and Arga beach were incorporated into naval property. The public has access to the base during Navy Week in December and in visiting educational groups. The naval base includes a civilian support community at Amadalli, a ship lift and a hospital. INS Kadamba is the homeport of India's largest aircraft carrier INS Vikramaditya.

==== INS Vajrakosh ====
INS Vajrakosh, commissioned on 9 September 2015, is the latest establishment of the Indian Navy at Karwar which will serve as special storage facility for specialised armaments and missiles. INS Vajrakosh will have all the required infrastructure and will be staffed by specialists to provide specialised servicing facilities for these sophisticated missiles and ammunition.

=== Aditya Birla Chemicals ===
Aditya Birla Chemicals (India) (ABCIL) is a unit of the Aditya Birla Group.

ABCIL has acquired chlor-alkali and phosphoric acid division of Ballarpur Industries Ltd. (BILT) / Solaris Chemtech Industries Limited, based in Karwar, Karnataka.

== Transport ==
=== Karwar International Airport ===
The proposed Karwar Airport will be built by the Indian Navy at Alageri village near Ankola, in Karnataka. The Airports Authority of India (AAI) will operate a civil enclave at the naval air base which is part of the Navy's Rs 100 billion Phase 2 of Project Seabird. After the construction Karwar will be the second city in Karnataka to have all 3 major modes of transport (Air, Sea, Land)

==== Konkan railway ====
Karwar railway station

The Konkan Railway connects Karwar to most major towns and cities. Karwar has two railway stations: Karwar and Asnoti. The nearest Goan station is Loliem, 18 km away. Madgaon Junction lies 68 km to the north. and Mangalore Junction 253 km to the south.

==== Port ====
The Karwar Port is acclaimed as one of the best natural all-weather ports on the West Coast, located in Uttar Kannada district at the Southern side of the Kali River. caters to the trading needs of northern Karnataka, Andhra Pradesh, and Maharashtra. The port is located in Baithkol, just beside the National Highway (NH66) that connects Mumbai and Kochi, one of the country’s busiest corridors. Also, it is only 8 km away from the Konkan Railway network.

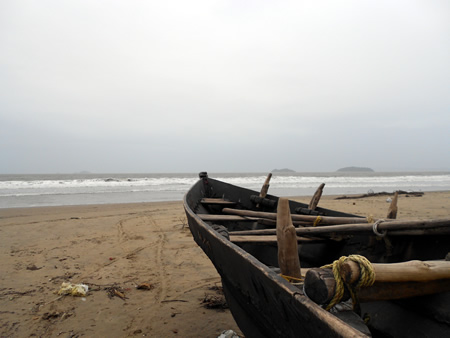
Karwar beach looking towards Madlimgadh and Kurumgad Islands

Hills and coastal islands make the port a natural harbour, sheltered from the Arabian sea. It is operated by the Government of Karnataka, services the hinterland of northern Karnataka, Goa and southern Maharashtra.

The length of the port is 355 metres (388 yd). The quay has two berths, with a draft capacity of 9.25 metres (30.3 ft). Karwar port also berths coastal vessels and there is a jetty for fishing vessels. The Government of Karnataka has planned to develop Karwar port on a Public Private Partnership (PPP) basis to provide six additional berths, a container terminal, and a rail link to Karwar railway station.

The port is able to handle all types of commodities, including "B" and "C" class petroleum products. There port has liquid storage tanks for bitumen, furnace oil, molasses, and HSD. A ban of iron ore mining and export in Karnataka state reduced congestion at the port. The port has arrangements for berthing coastal vessels, and a jetty for fishing boats.

In 2012, the Government of Karnataka carried out maintenance dredging in the port, the approach channel and the nearby anchorage. The port may be closed from 16 May to 15 September (the monsoon season). Part of the 2008 Hindi film Golmaal Returns was filmed at Karwar port.

== Tourism ==
=== Rabindranath Tagore beach ===
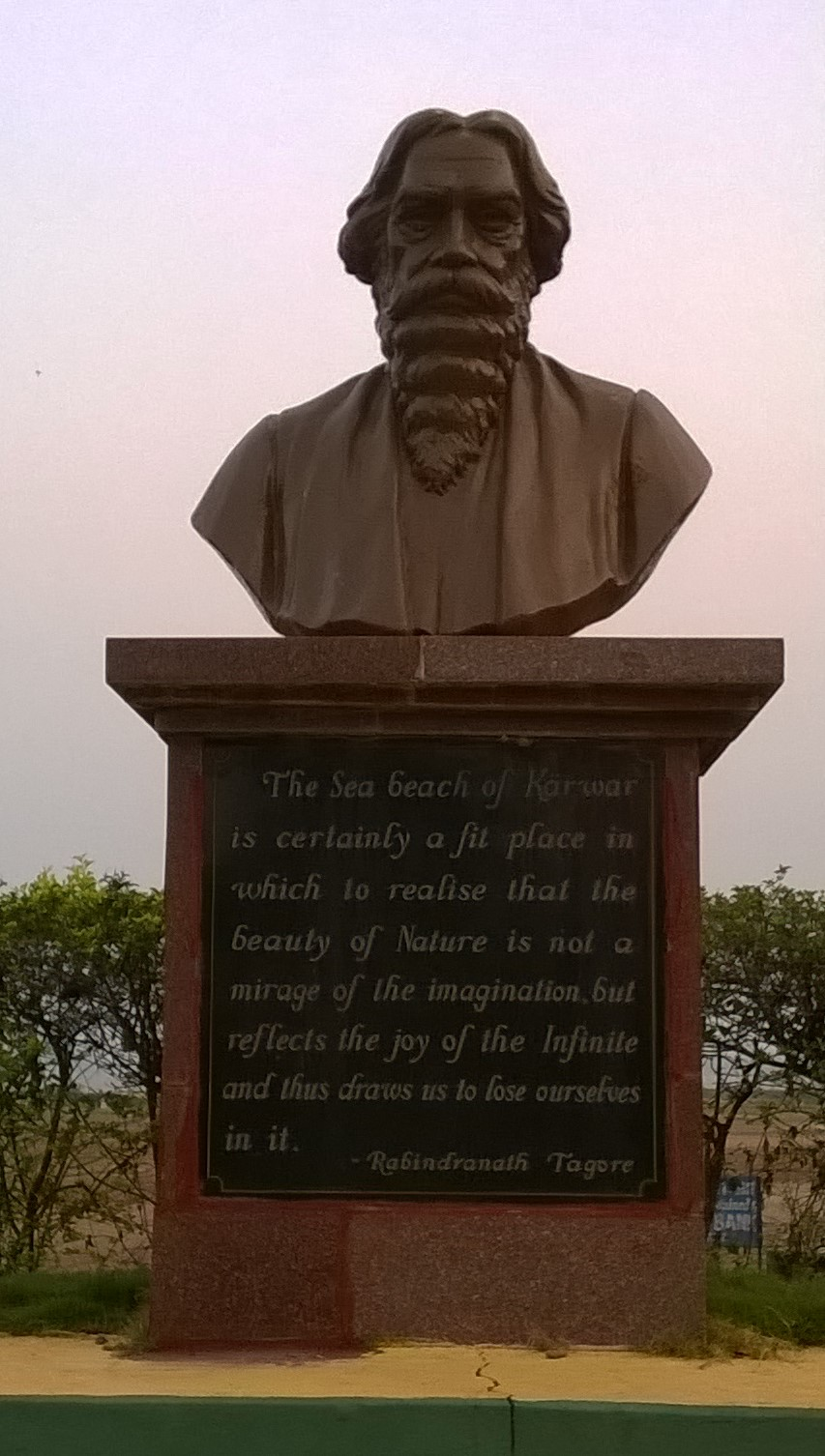
Rabindranath Tagore Statue at the Beach

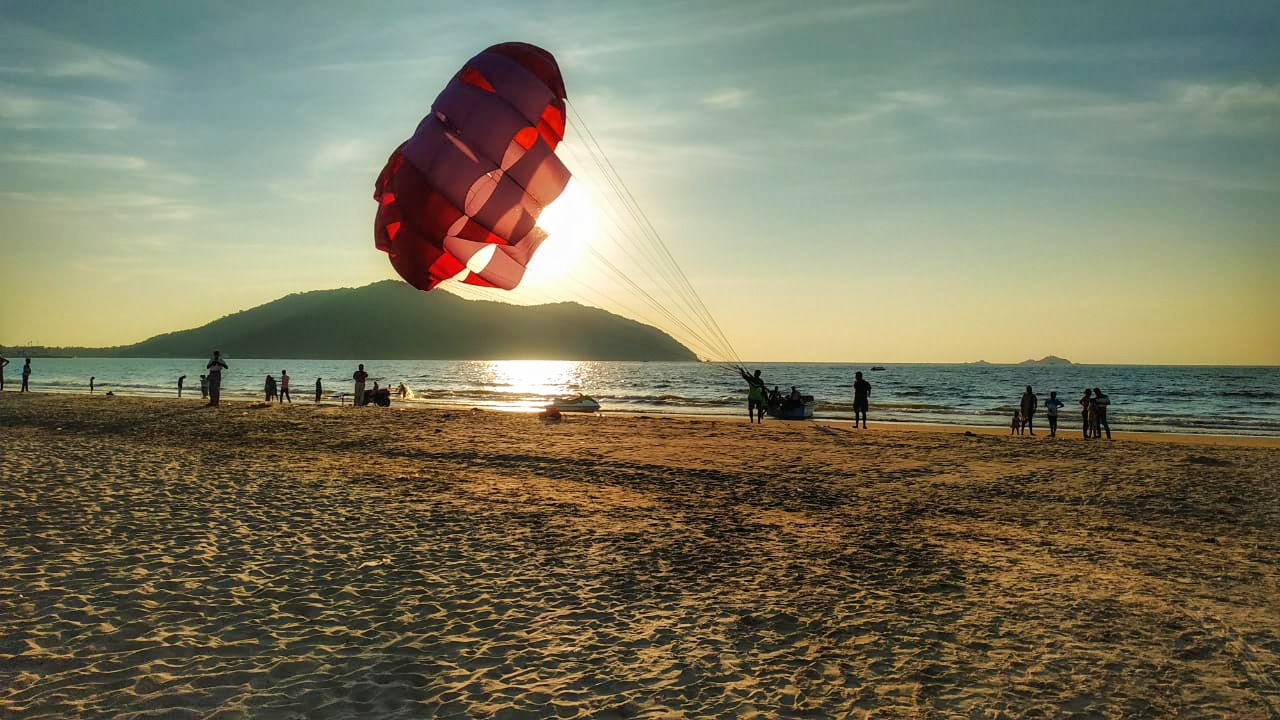
Glazing Rays on Rabindranath Tagore Beach

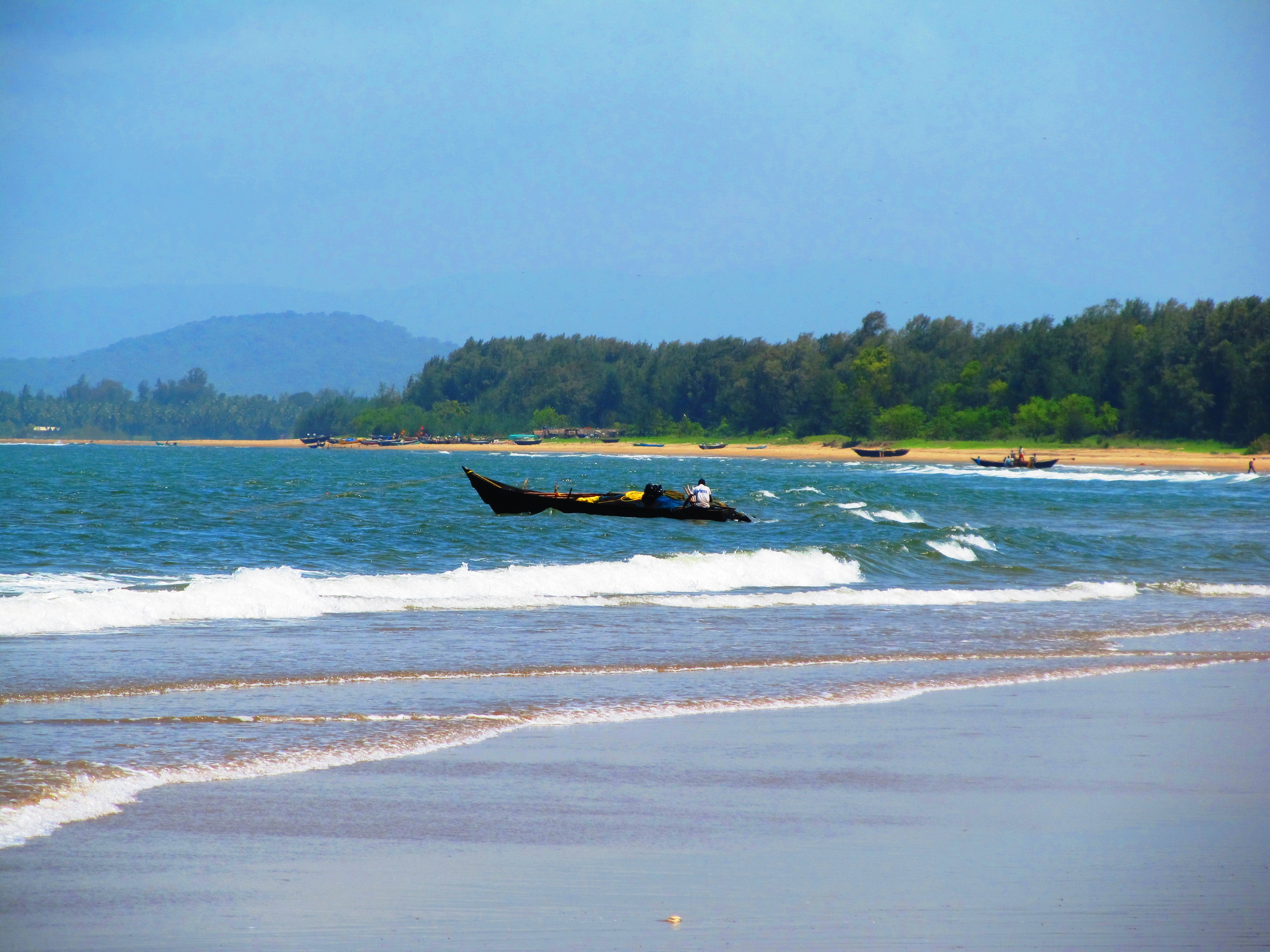
Tagore beach

"The sea beach of Karwar is certainly a fit place in which to realize that the beauty of Nature is not a mirage of the imagination, but reflects the joy of the Infinite and thus draws us to lose ourselves in it. Where the universe is expressing itself in the magic of its laws it may not be strange if we miss its infinitude; but where the heart gets into immediate touch with immensity in the beauty of the meanest of things, is any room left for argument?" – Rabindranath Tagore

=== Places of interest ===
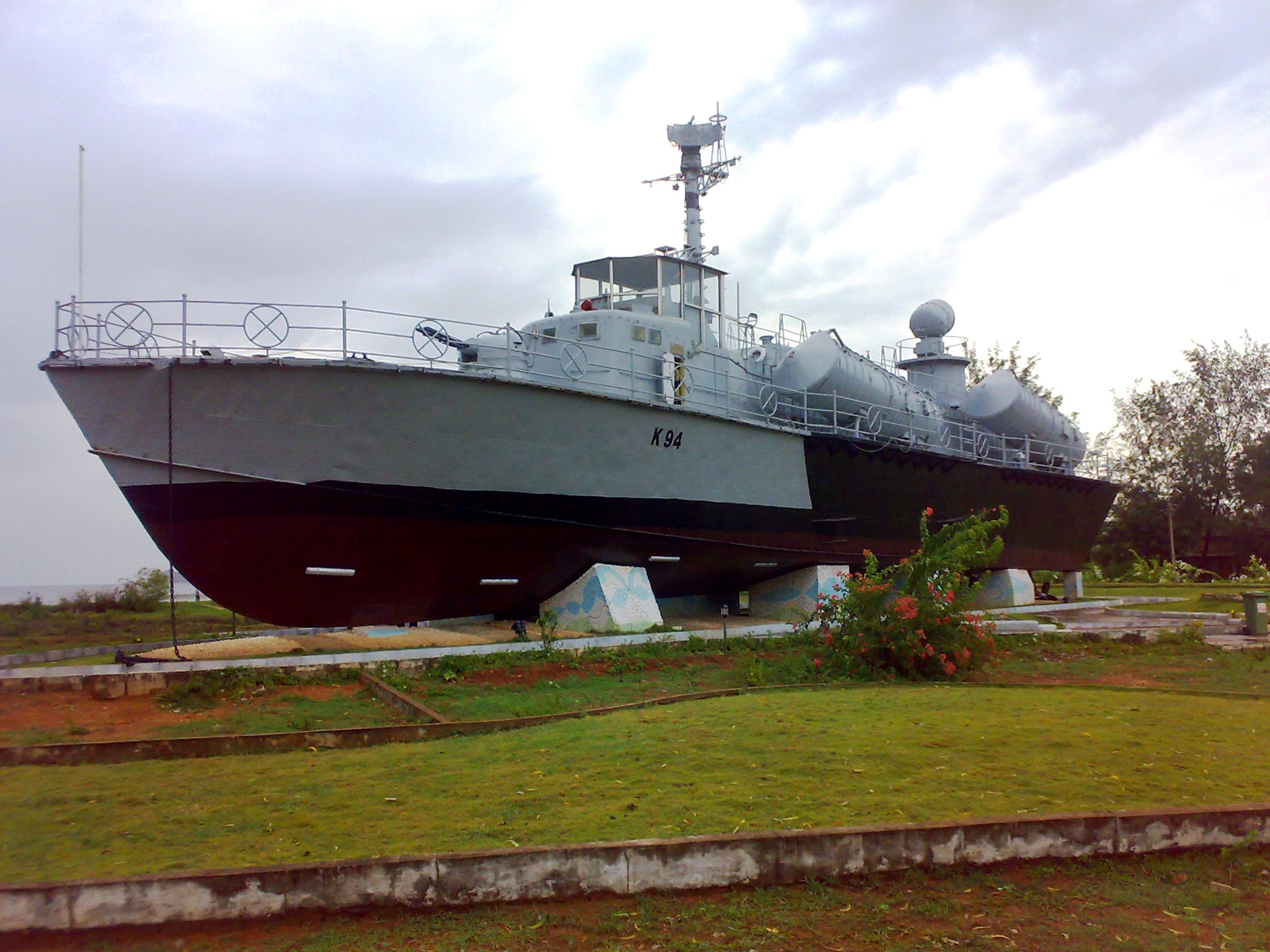
Maritime museum at Tagore beach, Rabindranath

Sadashivgad Fort from the Kali River Bridge

==== Seaside ====
- Kali River Garden, Kodibag
- Rock Garden, Karwar
- Binaga Beach
- Devbagh Beach
- Kali Bridge
- Karwar Beach
- Sub- Regional Science Centre
- Kurumgad Island
- Majali Beach
- Oyster Rock Lighthouse, a round white masonry construction with red trim protects ships from the rocks of Devgad Island, the largest off the Kali Estuary.
- Tilmatti beach, A black sand beach

==== Hinterland ====
- Anshi National Park
- Kadra & Kodsalli dam
- Chaitanya Park
- Chendia and Nagarmadi falls (a small waterfall which passes under a large rock)
- Devkar Falls
- Guddahalli Peak
- Habbu Mountain
- Hyder Ghat Pass
- Mudgeri Dam
- Shirve Ghat
- Makkeri

==== Historic sites ====
- Kot Shiveshvar
- Shri Narasimha temple, Siddar
- Sadashivgad Fort
- Shahkaramuddin dargah, Sadashivgad (tomb of a Sufi saint)
- Maritime museum

==== Educational tourism ====
- Karwar promotes educational tourism through the Sub-Regional Science Centre in Kodibag, which features interactive science exhibits and a virtual reality lab developed by fotonVR.

== Culture ==
=== Cuisine ===
Karwar is known for its seafood cuisine. Karwar cuisine has been historically influenced by Konkan and Goan cuisine with there being a lot of similarities and shared dishes. Fish curry, with cashews, coconut and rice is a staple dish. Karwar curries use ginger and turmeric but not always garlic.

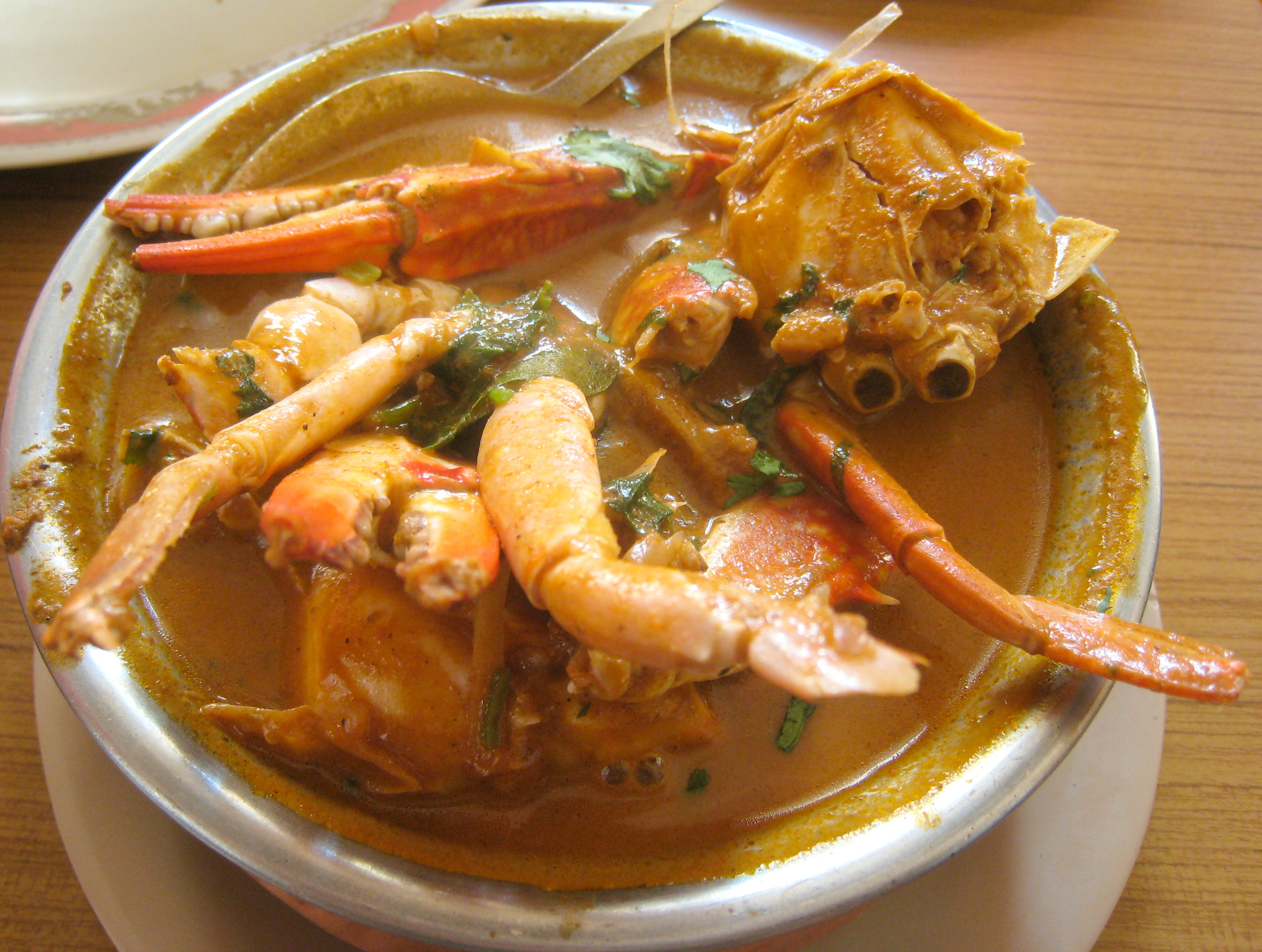
Kurle Ambat (crab masala), a local dish

=== Local festivals ===
- Kurumgad jatra
- São João where garlands of freshly picked fruits leaves and flowers are worn and people jump into wells, ponds, rivers, and lakes.
- Anjedweep island festival
- Karavali Utsav, an annual three of four-day festival at Rabindranath Tagore beach. It is organised by the Uttara Kannada District Administration as a cultural and social event. Many shops and stalls are installed at Tagore beach. People from all parts of the district and from all over the state and neighboring Goa state attend. Many cultural events are held in the evenings where regional, national and international artists including Bollywood stars, Kannada film stars, Goan artists and local artists perform.
- Karwar utsav in summer season where local artistes and celebrities come and perform.

=== Media ===
Media outlets include:

- Karwar News Konkani, Karwar Plus Konkani, This channels provides regular updates and news in local language Konkani.
- Karwar Mirror, An online news portal providing reliable and responsive non-political news about Karwar.
- Karwar eNews, online local newspaper.
- Karavali Munjavu, Kannada language daily newspaper.
- Zilla Varta Kendra media centre.
- District Library, near the district court and next to Mitra Samaj.
- All India Radio (Akashwani Kendra), Gurumath Road, Kajubag.

== Education ==
Karwar has Government and private engineering college and Government medical college. The city has private and Government schools and institutions for PU, diploma and ITI courses.

== Notable residents ==
- Rama Raghoba Rane (1918–1994), the only Param Vir Chakra Award winner from Karnataka
- Jayshree Gadkar, a Marathi movie actress of the 1960s, born to a Konkani speaking family in Kanasgiri, near Sadashivgad
- Bollywood singer Anuradha Paudwal, born in Karwar as Alka Nadakarni in a Konkani speaking family and brought up in Mumbai
- Gajanan Kirtikar, Member of parliament from Mumbai North West (Lok Sabha constituency)
- Krishna Kalle, Playback singer in Marathi, Hindi, and Kannada films

== Villages of Karwar ==
Karwar comprises the following blocks or villages:

- Ambrai
- Amadalli
- Angadi
- Arga
- Asnoti
- Baad
- Baitkol
- Balni
- Bhaire
- Bhagatwada
- bargadda
- Bhandishitta
- Binaga
- Birtulbag
- Bore
- Chendia
- Chittakulla
- Devalmakki
- Devabag
- Dhol
- Gopashitta
- Goyar
- Gotegali
- Halebag
- Halekote
- Halga
- Hankon
- Hapkarni
- Harwada
- Hosali
- Hotegali
- Kadra
- Kadwad
- Kaiga
- Kajubag
- Kalaswada
- Kanasgiri
- Karkal
- Kathinkon
- Kerwadi
- Kharga
- Kinner
- Kodibag
- Kolage
- Kurnipet
- Lower Makeri
- Majali
- Maingini
- Mallapur
- Mudgeri
- Nandangadda
- Nargeri
- Sadashivgad
- Sakalbalni
- Sanmudageri
- Shejebag
- Shejwad
- Shirwad
- Siddar
- Sunkeri
- Thoralebag
- Todur
- Ulga
- Umlijug

== See also ==
- Sadashivgad
- Kali river
- Uttara Kannada
