= Gudavi Bird Sanctuary =

Tourist destination in Karnataka

- IUCN category IV (habitat/species management area)
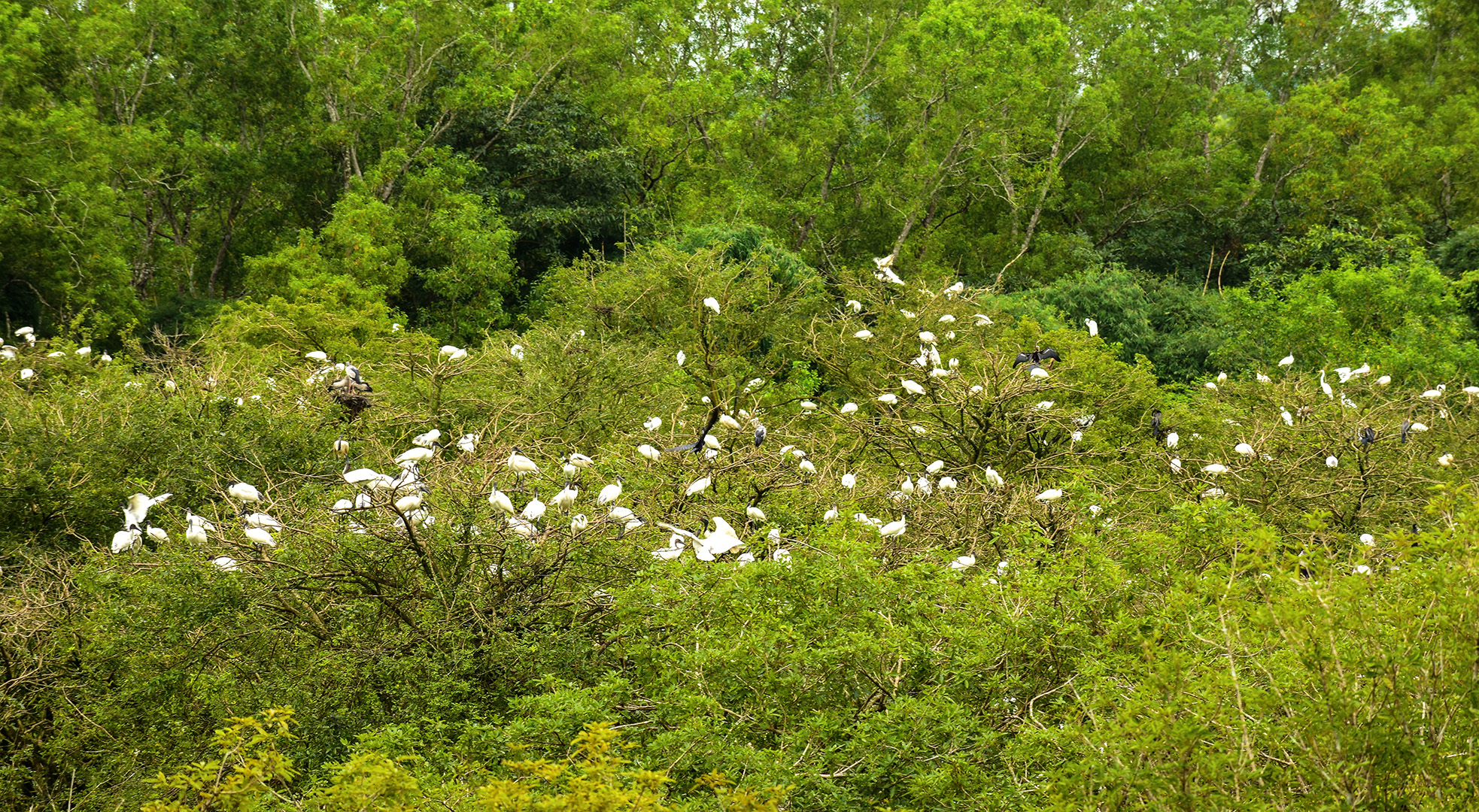
- Birds on the trees at Gudavi lake

- Location within Karnataka Location within India
- Interactive map of Gudavi Bird Sanctuary
- Location: Karnataka, India
- Coordinates: 14°26′23″N 75°0′45″E
- Area: 0.74 km^{2} (0.29 sq mi)

Gudavi Bird Sanctuary is a tourist destination in Malenadu region of Karnataka, Sanctuary is spread over an area of 0.74 square km. It is part of Soraba Taluk of Shivamogga district in Karnataka.

As per a 2009 survey, 217 different species of birds belonging to 48 families are found at this place.

A natural lake and the trees gives shelter to these birds. It is a small seasonal lake and is filled with water mostly in the rainy season. Various avian species migrate from across the globe in different seasons for breeding. A platform is built for bird watchers to have a closer look at the birds.

== Variety of birds ==
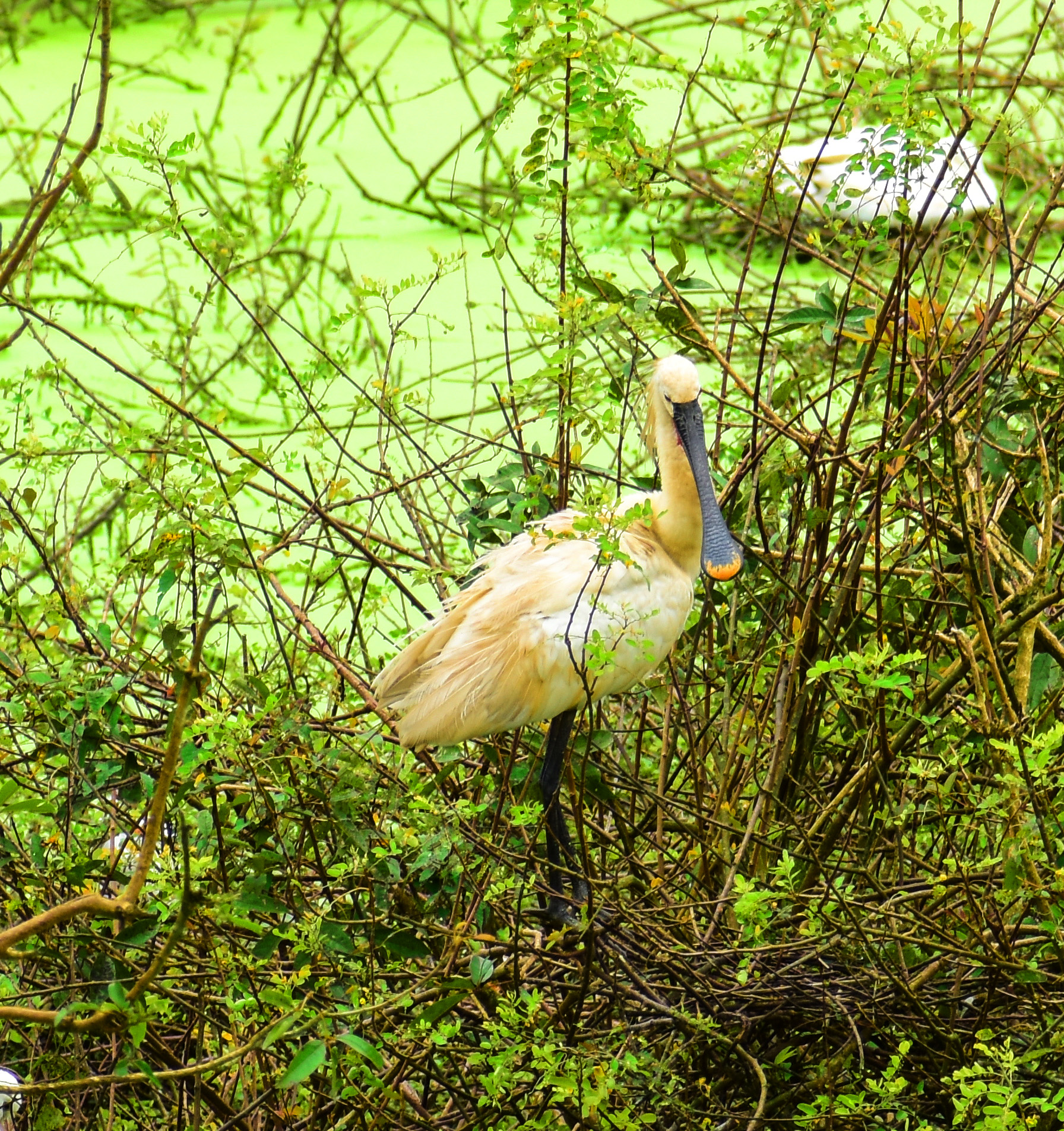
Eurasian Spoonbill

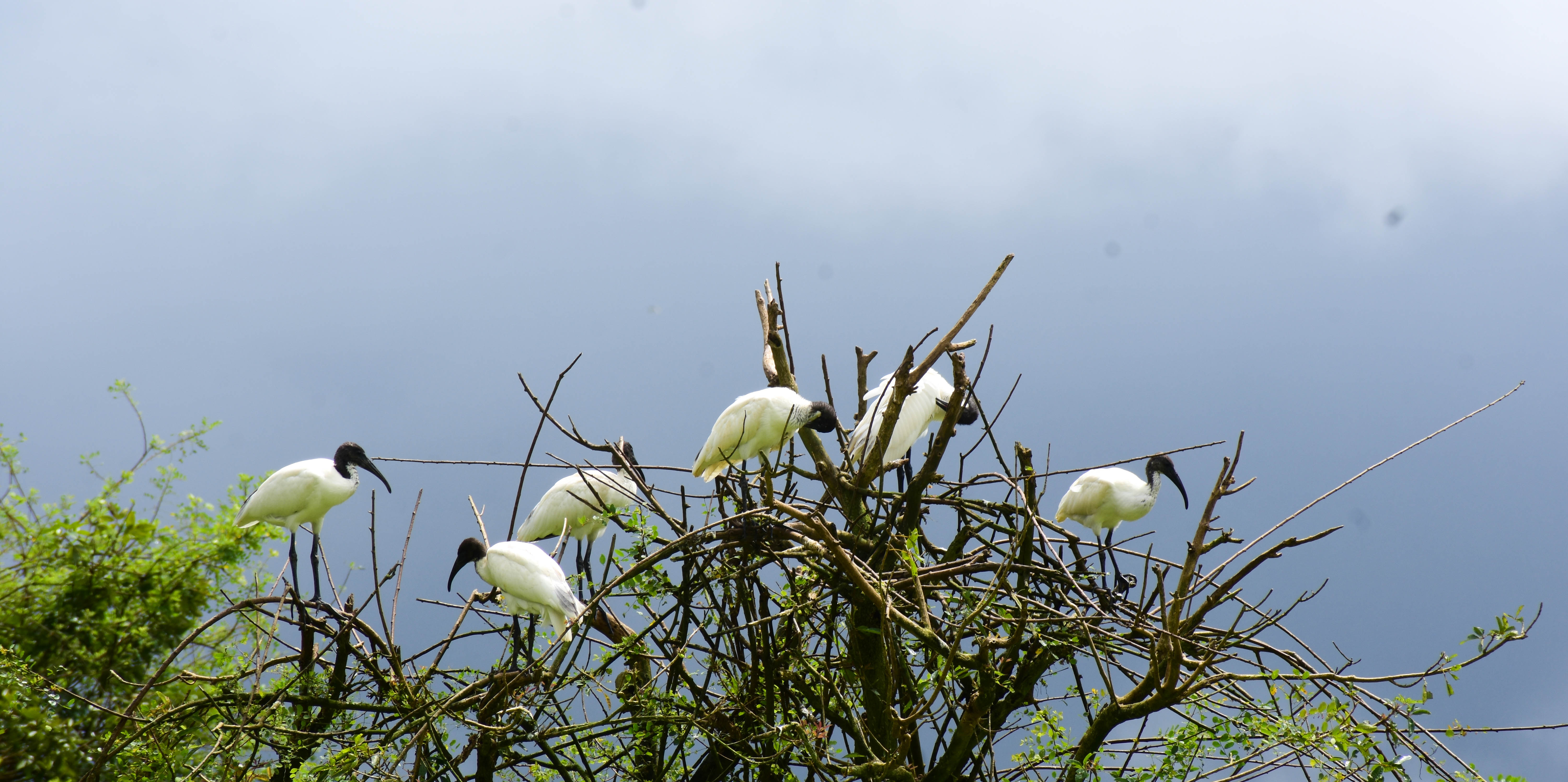
A group of Black-headed Ibis

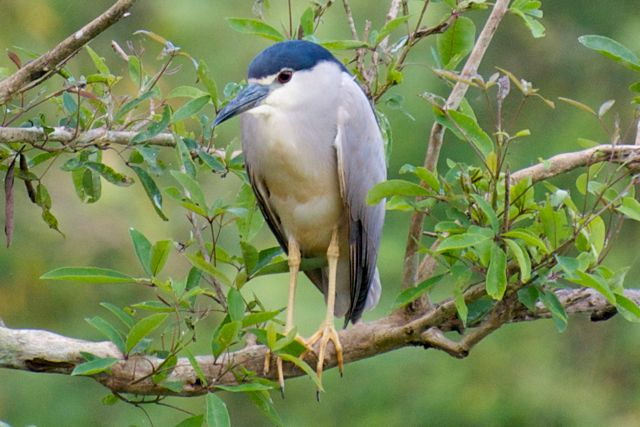
Black crowned night heron at Gudavi bird sanctuary

- Grey heron
- Night heron
- Little cormorant
- Grey junglefowl
- Indian pond heron
- Darter
- Indian shag
- Little grebe
- White ibis
- Pariah kite
- Brahminy kite
- Eurasian spoonbill

== Accessibility ==
- Nearest City
  - Sirsi (38 km)
- Nearest towns:
  - Banavasi (15 km)
  - Soraba(16 km)
  - Siddapura (25 km)
- Nearest train station:
  - Talaguppa (42 km)
- Nearest airport:
  - Hubli (165 km)

== See also ==
- Sirsi Marikamba Temple
- Yana
- Gudnapur Lake
