= Tadadi =

- Village
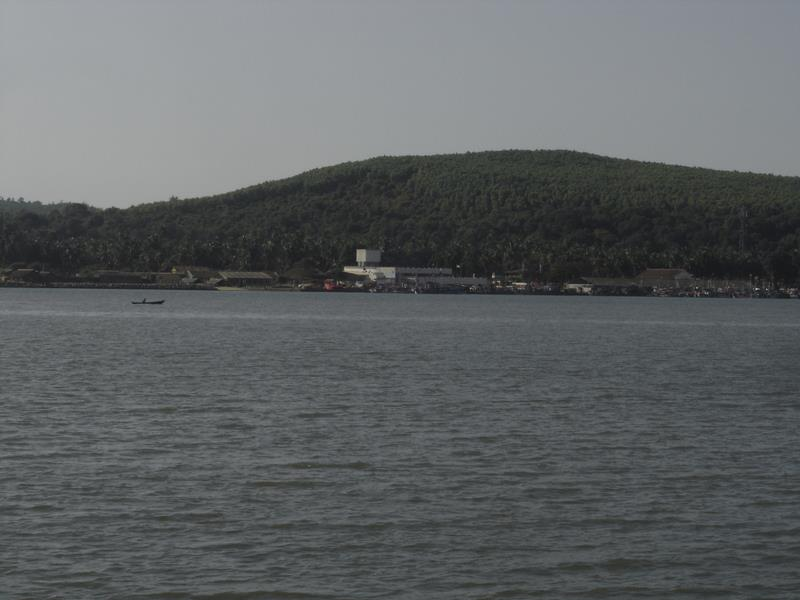
- Tadadi Port
- Country: India
- State: Karnataka
- District: Uttara Kannada

Languages
  - Official: Kannada
- Time zone: UTC+5:30 (IST)
- Nearest city: Kumta
- Lok Sabha constituency: Uttara Kannada
- Vidhan Sabha constituency: Gokarna

Tadadi (also spelled Tadri or Tadari) is a coastal village and port in Uttara Kannada district of Karnataka, India. It is located near Gokarna in Kumta taluk.

Tadadi is a coastal site in Karnataka located near the estuary of the Aghanashini River. The river, one of the few free-flowing rivers of the Western Ghats, empties into the Arabian Sea near Tadadi and forms an estuarine ecosystem covering about 1,800 hectares. The estuary supports mangroves and diverse marine life, including numerous fish and shellfish species. Trade in mollusks and fishing are important economic activities in the region, and salt production is also practiced by several local families.

The village has a fishing harbour and a fish processing plant which was set up with assistance from experts from Denmark. Many fishing communities depend on marine resources for their livelihood. Traditionally, men go fishing while women are involved in processing and preserving fish.

Tadadi is known locally for a variety of seafood such as shetli (prawns), bangade, taarlee, belanji, ravas, khubbe, tesriya, iswana, samdali, and paplet.

== Tourism ==
Tadadi has become a destination for visitors seeking quiet beaches, coastal landscapes, and backwater experiences. The village is located close to Gokarna and attracts weekend travelers from nearby towns and cities.

=== Tadadi Beach ===
Tadadi Beach is known for its relatively calm and less crowded shoreline compared with many other beaches along the Karnataka coast. The beach lies near the estuary where the Aghanashini River meets the Arabian Sea and offers scenic views of the coastline and surrounding hills.

=== Water activities ===
The backwaters and estuarine areas around Tadadi are sometimes used for recreational activities such as kayaking, boating, and coastal exploration. The calm waters of the Aghanashini estuary make it suitable for small boat rides and nature observation.

=== Aghanashini ferry ===
A ferry service operates across the Aghanashini River connecting Tadadi with the village of Aghanashini. The ferry allows pedestrians and two-wheelers to cross the river and provides a shorter route towards Kumta. The service operates frequently throughout the day and is widely used by both residents and visitors.

=== Trekking routes ===
Tadadi also serves as an access point for trekking routes along the coastline toward beaches around Gokarna, including Paradise Beach. These coastal trails are popular among trekking groups and visitors exploring the scenic cliffs and secluded beaches of the region.

Off late due to commercialization of the area, some beaches in the region have experienced pollution. Local activists and community groups have conducted campaigns to clean the beaches and protect the coastal environment.

== Demographics of Tadadi ==
Tadadi is a small village/hamlet in Kumta Taluk in Uttara Kannada District of Karnataka, India. It comes under Gokarna Panchayath. It is located 62 km south from the district headquarters of Karwar, 233 km from the chief port city of Mangalore, and 444 km from the state capital of Bangalore.

Tadadi is surrounded by Honnavara Taluk towards the south, Ankola Taluk towards the north, Sirsi Taluk towards the east, and Bhatkala Taluk towards the south.

Kumta, Ankola, Sirsi, and Karwar are the cities nearby Tadadi.

How to reach Tadadi: By Rail Kumta Railway Station are the very nearby railway stations to Tadadi (Even at Madanageri which is around 10 km. from Tadadi, Some trains will hault). Harwada Rail Way Station (near to Ankola), Ankola Rail Way Station (near to Ankola), Kumta Rail Way Station (near to Kumta) are the Rail way stations reachable from near by towns. However Madgaon Rail Way Station is major railway station 117 km near to Tadadi By Road Kumta, Ankola are the nearby by towns to Tadadi having road connectivity to Tadadi Nearby cities: Hanehalli-Bankikodla twin villages of North Kanara (ಹನೇಹಳಎಂಬ ಜಗತ್ತು), Kumta ಕುಮಟಾ, Honnavar

There are no colleges in the village. However, there is a Government Kannada Primary School. Students travel to the nearby towns for high school and college. Nearby cities for high school include Gokarna and nearby colleges are either in Ankola or Kumta cities.

Coordinates: 14°32'3"N 74°22'36"E

== Tadadi Port ==
Tadadi is a minor fishing port located at the mouth of Aghanashini River, Uttara Kannada District, in the Indian state of Karnataka. The port has an effective vast waterfront area, where minerals, forests, agricultural and marine wealth are in abundance.

The proposed power projects at Tadari are being opposed on environmental grounds by farmers and fishermen, who believe that they would lead to pollution of river Aghanashini. Fishermen feel that these projects would lead to reduction in fish catch. Sea erosion is a problem in the coastal belt.

The port lies at the mouth of Aghanashini, about 54 km north of Honnavar. Tons of silica sand was exported through this port. It is one of the proposed ports to be developed into mega ports, under the Sagarmala project of the Government of India.

== Language and religion ==
The main languages spoken in the region include Kannada along with Konkani and Urdu. Kannada is the predominant language used in administration and daily communication, while Konkani is also widely spoken by local communities. Urdu and English are also used for social and commercial communication.

Several places of worship representing different religions are located in Tadadi. The Ashwath Ganapati Temple is a well-known temple in the village and is visited by devotees from nearby areas.

The Shri Alavi Anjaneya Temple (ಶ್ರೀ ಅಳವಿ ಆಂಜನೇಯ ದೇವಸ್ಥಾನ) is another prominent temple in Tadadi, located near the coastal area. The temple is built on a natural single rock formation and is known for a tall statue of Hanuman installed above the temple structure overlooking the nearby beach.

A dargah is also located near the banks of Tadadi and is associated with traditions linked to Sufi saints connected to Sadashivgad in Karwar. A mosque and Muslim burial grounds are located nearby, reflecting the presence of the Muslim community in the area.

Hinduism and Islam are among the religions practiced by residents of Tadadi, and the village contains places of worship associated with both communities.

== Cuisine ==
Tadadi is known for seafood such as jhinga (prawns/shrimp), bangade (mackerel), shevtta, taarlee (sardines), belunje, ravas, khubbe (mussels), tesriya (clams), sharmaie, and sondale.

Uttara Kannada is famous for a variety of seafood delicacies. Fish curry and rice is the staple diet of locals, as well as cashews and coconut. The staple diet includes a portion of steamed rice and a vegetable or seafood accompaniment/dried fish. Seafood is immensely popular due to its ease of availability and is prepared with a lot of local spices.

Naal kharachna (Coconut scraping) is a must activity before cooking, as coconut and coconut milk are a compulsory ingredient of the local cuisine; coconut is used extensively in all foods. Sukki Macchi is a famous side dish eaten during every meal.
