= Adalli =

Coordinates: 19°13′N 78°15′E

- village
- Interactive map of Adalli
- Country: India
- State: Karnataka
- District: Uttara Kannada
- Talukas: Sirsi

Government
  - Body: Village Panchayat

Languages
  - Official: Kannada
- Time zone: UTC+5:30 (IST)
- Nearest city: Uttara Kannada
- Civic agency: Village Panchayat

Adalli is a village in the southern state of Karnataka, India. It is located in the Sirsi taluk of Uttara Kannada district.

== See also ==
- Uttara Kannada
- Districts of Karnataka
