= Benne Hole Falls =

Tourist destination near Sirsi, Karnataka

- Location: Benne Hole Falls; Uttara Kannada, Karnataka
- Coordinates: 14.504442°N 74.624403°E
- Elevation: 335 m (1,099 ft)
- Total height: 61 m (200 ft)
- Number of drops: 1
- Watercourse: Aghanashini River

Benne Hole Falls is a waterfall and a tourist destination located at a distance of 36 km (22 mi) from Sirsi in Karnataka, India.

== Benne Hole Falls ==
Benne Hole Falls is made by the tributary of the Aghanashini River, which flows through the Devimane Ghat region of the Western Ghats. In Benne hole the word ‘benne’ means butter and ‘hole’ means big stream, which indicates the soft stream of this waterfalls, it is located near Sirsi, One has to first reach a village called Kasage from Sirsi and from there the falls are about 5 km away; the first 3 km can be covered by jeep and next 2 km by walking.
