= Ajjibal =

- village
- Ajjibal is in Uttara Kannada district
- Country: India
- State: Karnataka
- District: Uttara Kannada
- Talukas: Sirsi

Government
  - Body: Village Panchayat

Languages
  - Official: Kannada
- Time zone: UTC+5:30 (IST)
- Postal code: 581340
- Nearest city: Uttara Kannada
- Civic agency: Village Panchayat

Ajjibal is a village in the southern state of Karnataka, India. It is located in the Sirsi taluk of Uttara Kannada district in Karnataka.

The village is adjacent to Sirsi- Siddapur state highway 93. A co-operative society serving since 1919, presently called as Ajjibal Group Gramagala Seva Sahakari Bank Ltd., has the credit of being one of the best managed society. Ajjibal has an oil mill, a blacksmith workshop- aachaari shaale, both of which are much helpful to the farmers around. The village homes famous Shambhulinga temple. Another ancient temple, Prabhu Devasthana is located in Karoor, a nearby village. G.S. Hegde Ajjibal, a former MLA, journalist and confidant of Ramakrishna Hegde is from this village.

== See also ==
- Sirsi, Karnataka
- Uttara Kannada
- List of districts of Karnataka
- Karwar
- Mangalore
