= Adnalli =

Coordinates: 14°43′N 74°54′E

- village
- Interactive map of Adnalli
- Country: India
- State: Karnataka
- District: Uttara Kannada
- Talukas: Sirsi

Government
  - Body: Village Panchayat

Languages
  - Official: Kannada
- Time zone: UTC+5:30 (IST)
- Nearest city: Uttara Kannada
- Civic agency: Village Panchayat

Adnalli is a village in the southern state of Karnataka, India. It is located in the Sirsi taluk of Uttara Kannada district in Karnataka.

== See also ==
- Uttara Kannada
- Districts of Karnataka
- Karwar
- Mangalore
