= Sahasralinga =

Tourist destination near Sirsi, Karnataka

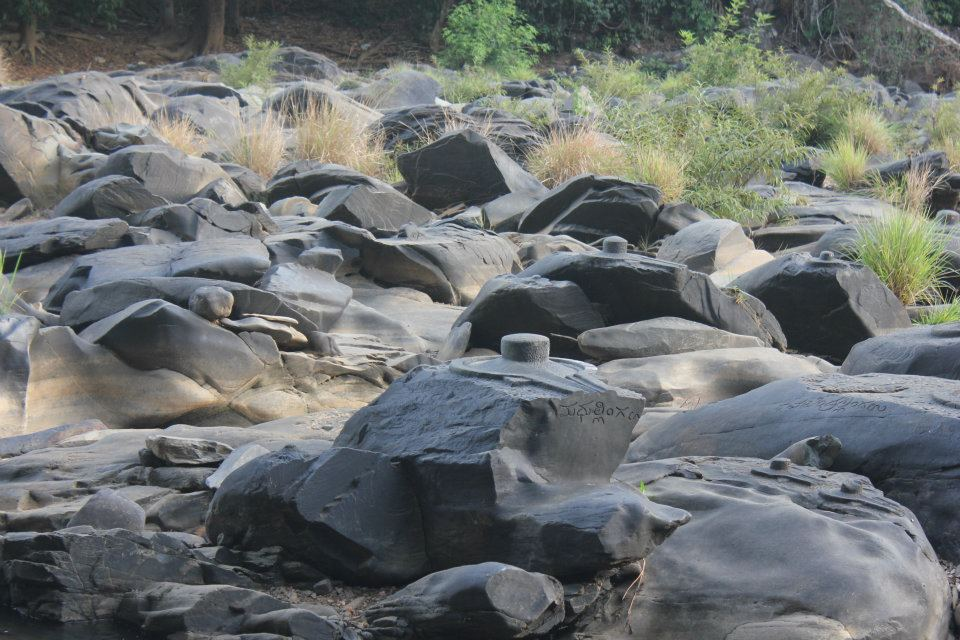
- Some of the lingas of Sahasralinga as photographed in 2013.

- Location in Karnataka

Religion
- Affiliation: Hinduism
- Deity: Shiva

Location
- Location: Sirsi
- State: Karnataka
- Country: India
- Coordinates: 14.7198°N 74.8070°E

Architecture
- Site area: Shalmala River

Sahasralinga (lit. 'thousand lingas') is a pilgrimage place, located around 14 km from the Sirsi Taluk in the district of Uttara Kannada of Karnataka state in India. It is in the river Shalmala and is famous for being the location where around a thousand lingas are carved on rocks in the river and on its banks.

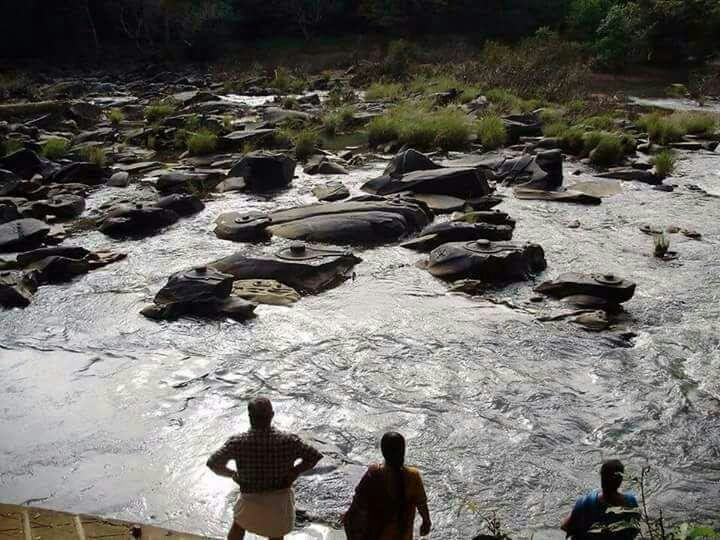
Thousands of shivlingas appearing in shalmala river bed due to global warming effect.

Sahasralingeśvara temple located near sirsi and is situated on the banks of the river shalmala, where a thousand lingas are found.

The lore begins after Kurukshetra war, as Krishna suggests Pandavas to get Puṣpa Mṛga to hold Rajasooryadwara Yaga. Bhima dashes to Mahendragiri to fetch it. On the way he meets Hanuman taking rest, which is stretched on his way. Bhima finds it difficult to cross the tail of Hanuman and requests to remove the tail. Hanuman asks Bhima to lift tail but he struggles and fails. Later both realised that both are divine powers. Hanuman learns the purpose of Bhima's journey and offers him hair from his tail for the protection.

Bhima, after reaching Mahendragiri meets pushpamruga and it agrees on a condition that it would follow him only a manovega-speed at which mind moves. Bhima agrees trusting the tail hair. While leading the animal, whenever Bhima finds he cannot keep the pace with the animal, he drops a hair. Strangely a "Shivalinga" appears just on the spot and pushpamruga proceeds only after worshipping the linga. This gives Bhima sufficient time to adjust his speed. When they reach the place called Uppinangady, Bheem finds difficult and drops remaining one thousand tail hair. A thousand lingas appear and by the time animal completes worship, Bhima safely reaches Yagamantapa. Thus it is believed that a thousand Lingas are found in the temple vicinity.One out of those Lingas found in the middle of the river sand becomes visible in the month of February.

The lingas in Uppinangady are under the river and are naturally formed, not carved.

== History ==
The Shiva Lingas were built under the patronage of Sadashivarayavarma, king of the Sirsi kingdom (1678-1718). It is also possible to see many Nandi (vehicle of lord Shiva) which are carved in front of the Shivalingas.

== Religious significance ==
Linga is a symbol of worship of the Hindu God, Shiva. On the auspicious day of Mahashivaratri thousands of pilgrims visit Sahasraliṅga to offer their prayers to Shiva.

== See also ==
- Sirsi Marikamba Temple
- Malenadu
- Yana, India
