= Shivaganga Falls =

Tourist destination near Sirsi, Karnataka

- Location: Shivaganga Falls; Uttara Kannada, Karnataka
- Coordinates: 14.797218°N 74.756987°E
- Elevation: 348 m (1,142 ft)
- Total height: 74 m (243 ft)
- Number of drops: 1
- Watercourse: Shalmali River

Shivaganga Falls is a water fall and a tourist destination located at a distance of 37 km (23 mi) from Sirsi in Karnataka state of India.

== Shivaganga Falls ==
Shivaganga falls is surrounded by a thick forest of Western Ghats, it was created by a small river Sonda River near Sirsi city in Karnataka.
