= Unchalli Falls =

Waterfall Near Sirsi, Karnataka

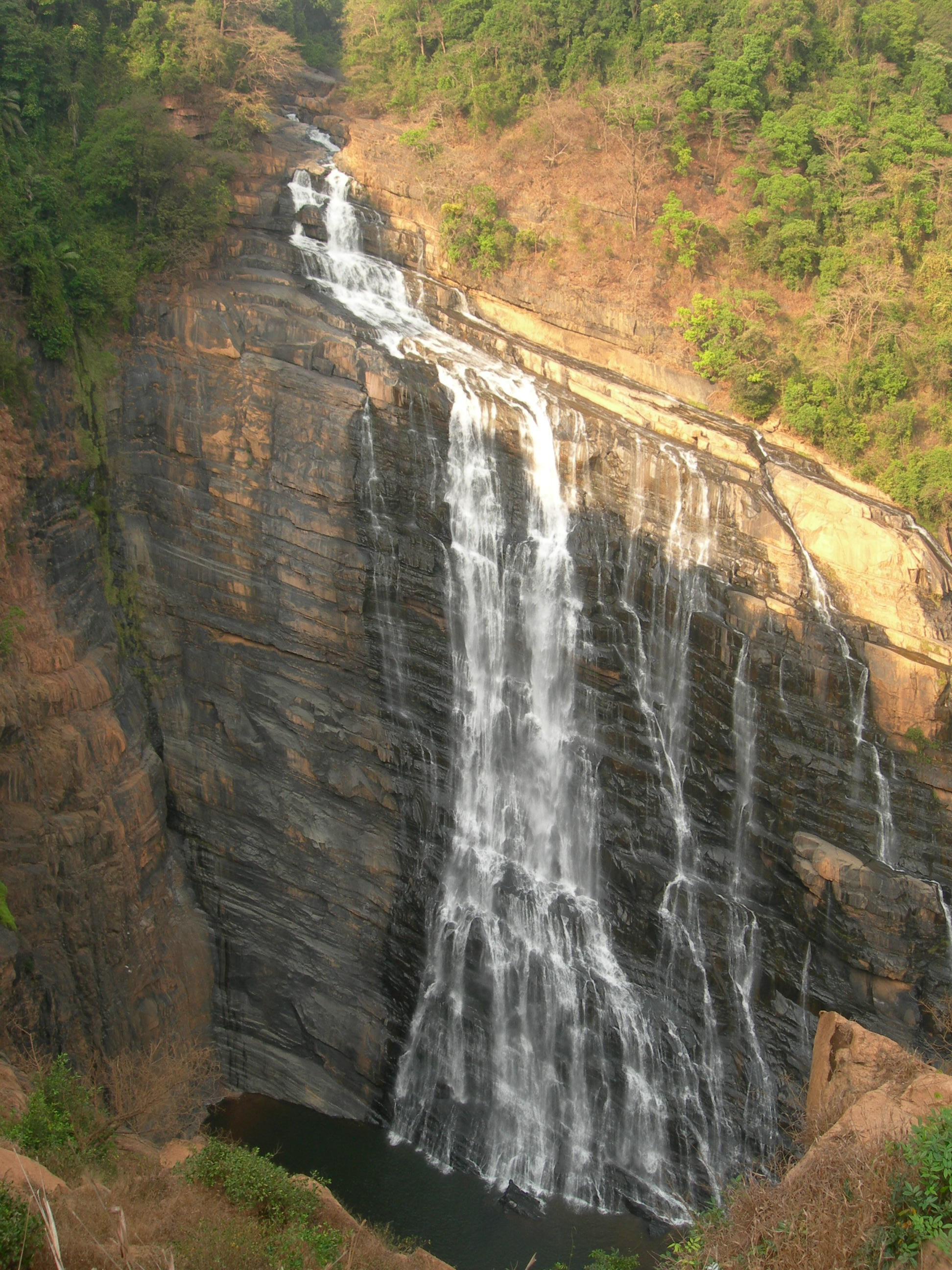
- Interactive map of Unchalli Falls
- Location: Sirsi, Uttara Kannada district, Karnataka, India.
- Coordinates: 14°24′34″N 74°44′51″E
- Total height: 116 metres (381 ft)
- Watercourse: Aghanashini River

Unchalli Falls, also known as Lushington Falls, is a waterfall created by a 116-metre (381 ft) drop in the River Aghanashini in Karnataka, India. The falls are located 35 km (22 mi) from Sirsi . The falls were named for J. D. Lushington, a District Collector for the British Government, who discovered the falls in 1845. It is one of world's five waterfalls where one can witness the extremely rare phenomena "Moonbows".

The falls are sometimes called Keppa Joga because of the deafening sound they make.

== Location ==
Siddapur is approximately 35 kilometres (22 mi) from the falls.

Heggarne is approximately 5 kilometres (3.1 mi) away, but visitors need to trek through a dense forest.

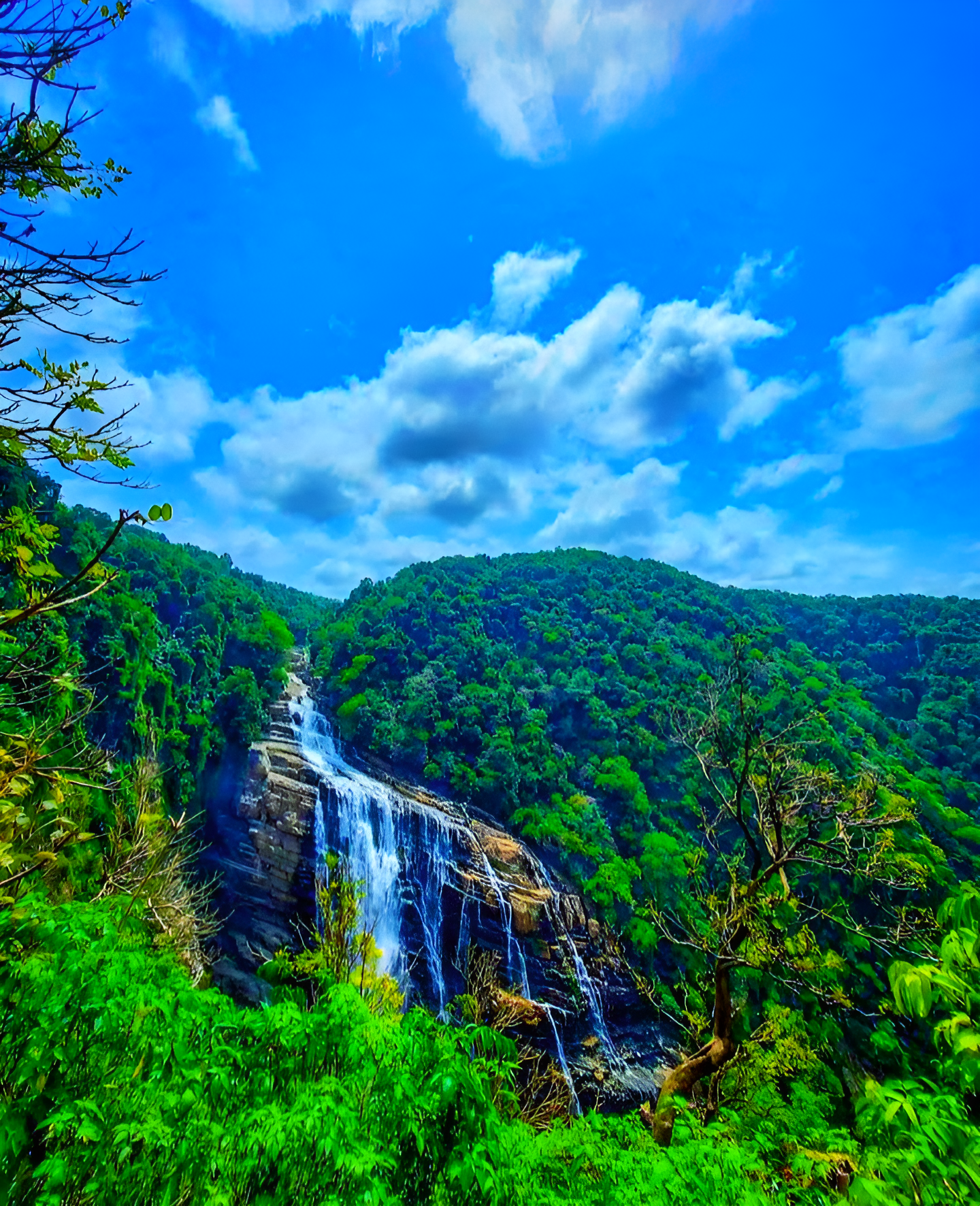
Surroundings

== See also ==
- List of waterfalls
- List of waterfalls in India
