= Sirsi Educational District =

- ಸಿರ್ಸಿ ಶೈಕ್ಷಣಿಕ ಜಿಲ್ಲೆ
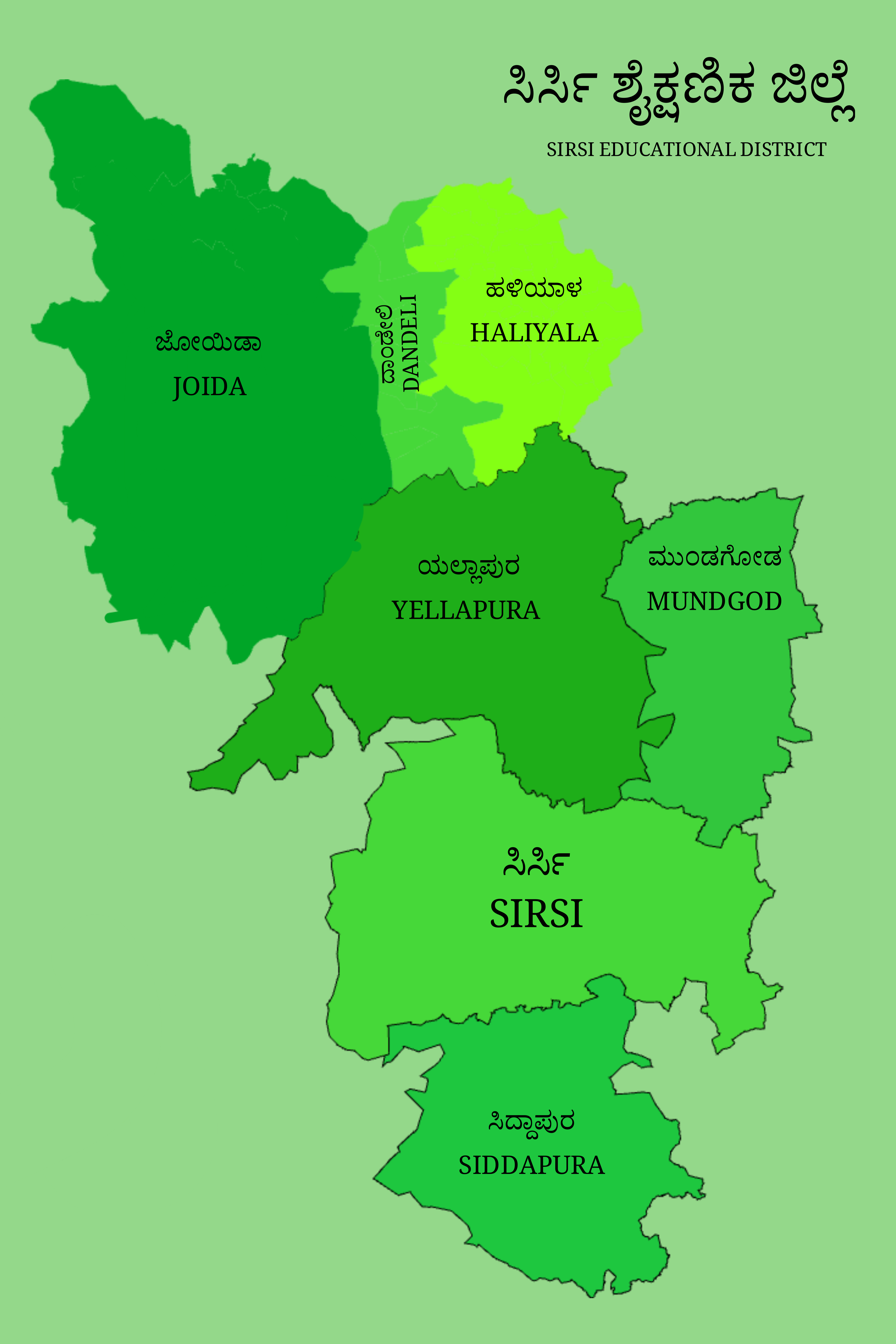
- Country: India
- State: Karnataka
- Founded: 01 October 2009
- Headquarters: Sirsi
- Blocks: Sirsi; Siddapur; Mundagod; Yellapur; Joida; Dandeli; Haliyal
- Literacy: 94.82%
- Website: dietsirsi.karnataka.gov.in

Sirsi Educational District ( ಸಿರ್ಸಿ ಶೈಕ್ಷಣಿಕ ಜಿಲ್ಲೆ ) is the educational district in Karnataka, It became the 34th educational district in the state, following approval from the Karnataka State Government in 2009. This change aimed to improve the management and delivery of primary and secondary education in the area. As of 2021, Sirsi Education District achieved the highest school admission rate in Karnataka, with 98.3% of its target of 1.1 lakh (110,000) students enrolled, according to the Students Achievement Tracking System.
