= Bedara Vesha =

Folk dance performance

Bedaravesha
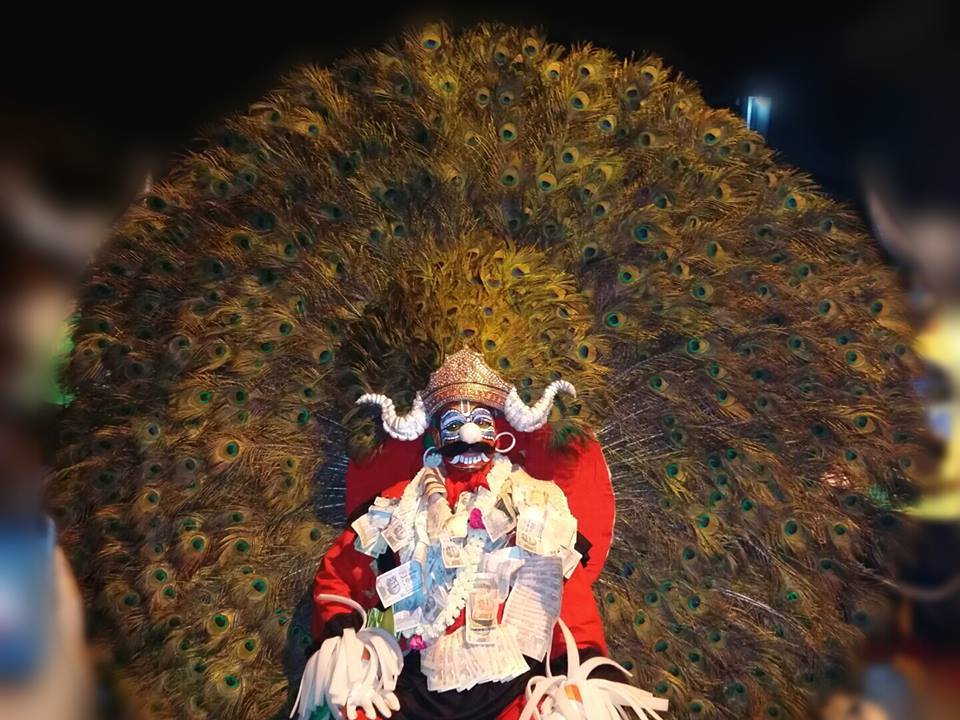
- Status: Active
- Genre: Folk dance
- Frequency: Biennial
- Venue: Sirsi
- Country: India
- Years active: 337
- Inaugurated: 1689
- Founder: Villagers
- Most recent: 2025
- Previous event: 2023
- Next event: 2027
- 2025

Bedara Vesha is a folk dance performed days before the Hindu festival of Holi in Sirsi town of Karnataka, India. It is also known as ‘Hunter Dance’. People of Sirsi celebrate Holi with this unique folk dance every alternate year. It attracts a large crowd from different parts of the state on all the five days.

== How is it done? ==
Bedara Vesha is practised for months before the actual performance. The artistes don peacock feathers, moustache, red cotton cloth, fruits, shields and swords. Two ropes are tied & held to the waist of the performer, balancing the giant headpiece. The performance depicts the tale of Malleshi prevented from killing the people who come to his place. The dance is accompanied by the hand drum (Tamate) players with a coordinated rhythm. The performer starts from his local street and goes on performing to the various locations of the Sirsi town overnight. The concluding part of the dance is at the Shri Marikamba Temple. The dancer performs at his complete rage there. He again starts performing in the other locations of the Sirsi town until daylight.

There are multiple performers. In each area, there will be one person who will represent and dance throughout the city. There are some designated places where the dance will be in full form and each performer will visit those designated places once. It is also said that one dancer isn’t supposed to look at the other face to face.

== Popular places where it is performed ==
Bedara Vesha is performed in the Sirsi town of Karnataka. Another folk dance called ‘'Dollu Kunitha'’ is also performed during Bedara Vesha.

== Modern form ==
Nearly 50 solo artists perform Bedara Vesha with whistle-blowers and a troupe of drum beaters. In modern times various performances are held on the streets along with The Hunter Dance. Bedara Vesha event is an enjoyable night out for the youngsters of the town. In recent years (such as 2019), Hunter Dance organisers have begun to hire DJs to the streets, and the whole of Sirsi town has a club-like look, to further entertain the spectators.
