= Banavasi Madhukeshwara Temple =

Tourist destination near Sirsi, Karnataka

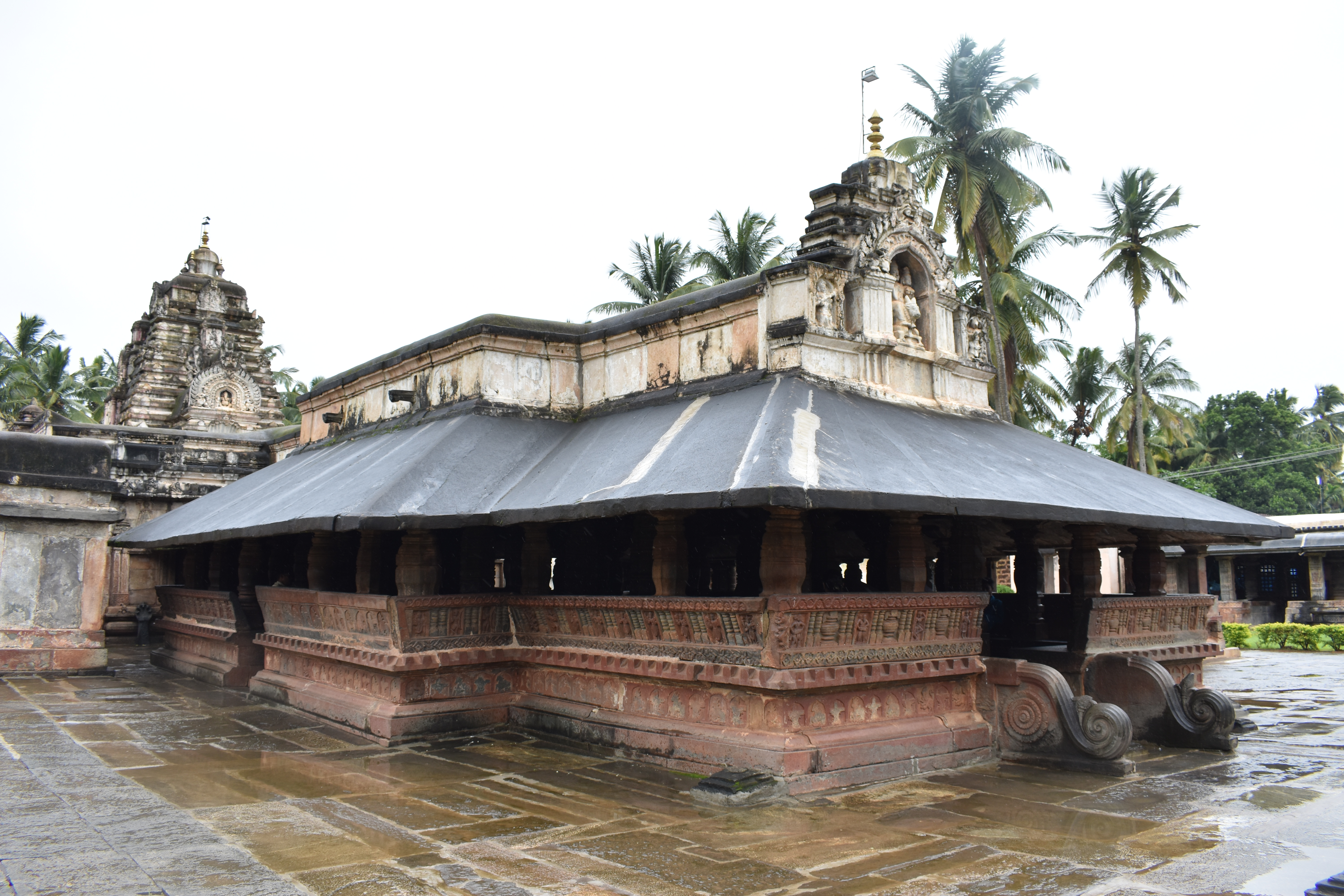

- Location in Karnataka

Religion
- Affiliation: Hinduism
- District: Uttara Kannada
- Deity: Shiva
- Festivals: Maha Shivaratri; Banavasi Fair

Location
- State: Karnataka
- Country: India
- Interactive map of Banavasi Madhukeshwara Temple
- Coordinates: 14.5352632°N 75.01711550652684°E

Architecture
- Style: Kadamba architecture
- Founder: Kadamba dynasty

Banavasi Madhukeshwara Temple is an ancient Hindu temple dedicated to Shiva. It is located in Banavasi, which is in Karnataka State of India, 24 km (15 mi) away from the nearest city, Sirsi.

== History ==
The Madhukeshwara Temple was built in the 2nd century by Kannada's first kingdom Kadamba dynasty.

== Gallery ==
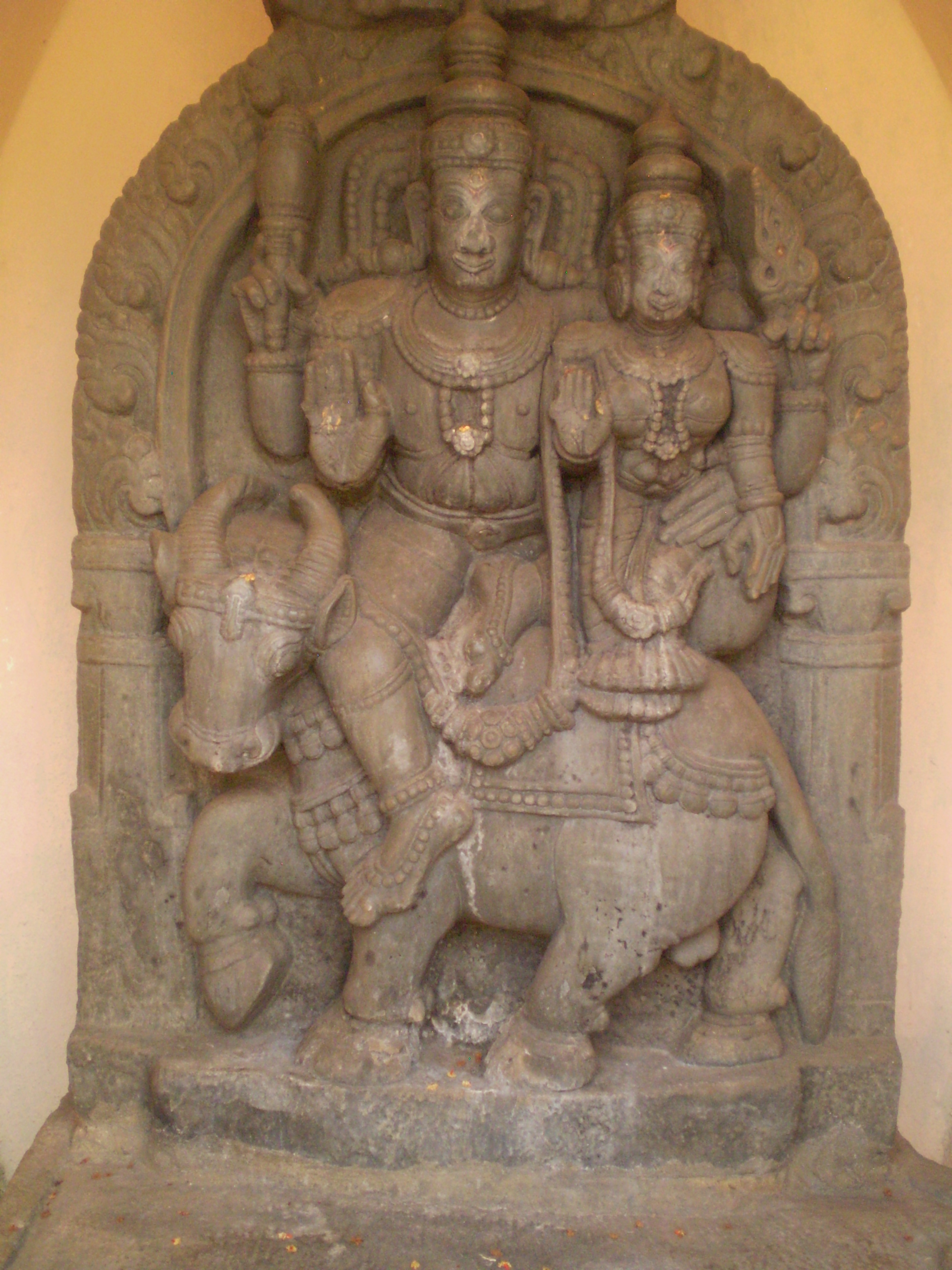
