= Halasinakatte =

- Village
- Location in Karnataka, India Halasinakatte (India)
- Coordinates: 14.60°N 74.85°E
- Country: India
- State: Karnataka
- District: Uttara Kannada district
- Named for: Abundance of Jackfruit

Area
  - Total: 1 km^{2} (0.39 sq mi)
- Elevation: 1,024 m (3,360 ft)

Population (2015)(estimated)
  - Total: 15
  - Density: 15/km^{2} (39/sq mi)

Languages
  - Official: Kannada
- Time zone: UTC+5:30 (IST)
- PIN: 581403
- Telephone code: +91 8283
- Vehicle registration: KA-31
- Lok Sabha constituency: Sirsi
- Climate: >

Halasinakatte is a remote village located in Sirsi Taluk of Uttara Kannada district of Karnataka.
