= Aghanashini (village) =

- village
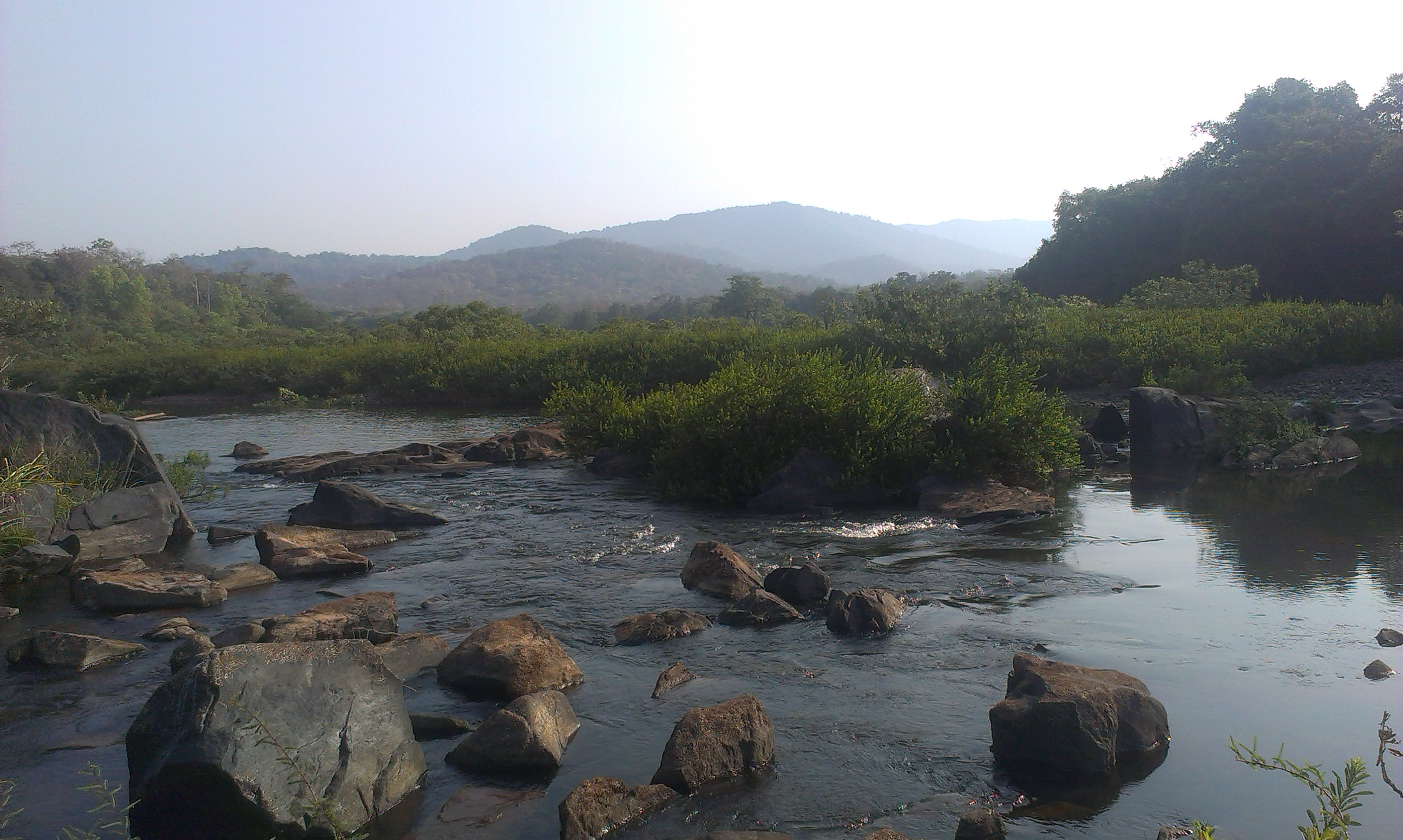
- Aghanashini River

- Location in Karnataka, India Aghanashini (India)
- Coordinates: 14.520°N 74.368°E
- Country: India
- State: Karnataka
- District: Uttara Kannada
- Tehsil: Kumta

Government
  - Body: Village Panchayat

Languages
  - Official: Kannada
- Time zone: UTC+5:30 (IST)

Aghanashini (transl. One who destroys sins) is a small village situated on the southern banks of River Aghanashini in the state of Karnataka, India. The river Aghanashini originates at 'Shankara Honda' in the Sirsi city. It is one of the virgin rivers of the world. The water from this river flows unobstructed through the Western Ghats range and then joins the Arabian Sea.

== History ==
=== Rajamundroog ===
Rajamundroog was the name of a redoubt adjacent to Aghanashini. It was a small square fort built of brown stone. At one point it was besieged by Hyder Ali and subsequently was taken by the East India Company.

== See also ==
- Uttara Kannada
- Districts of Karnataka
- Mangalore
