= Aghanashini River =

Aghanashini River (ತದಡಿ ಹೊಳೆ)
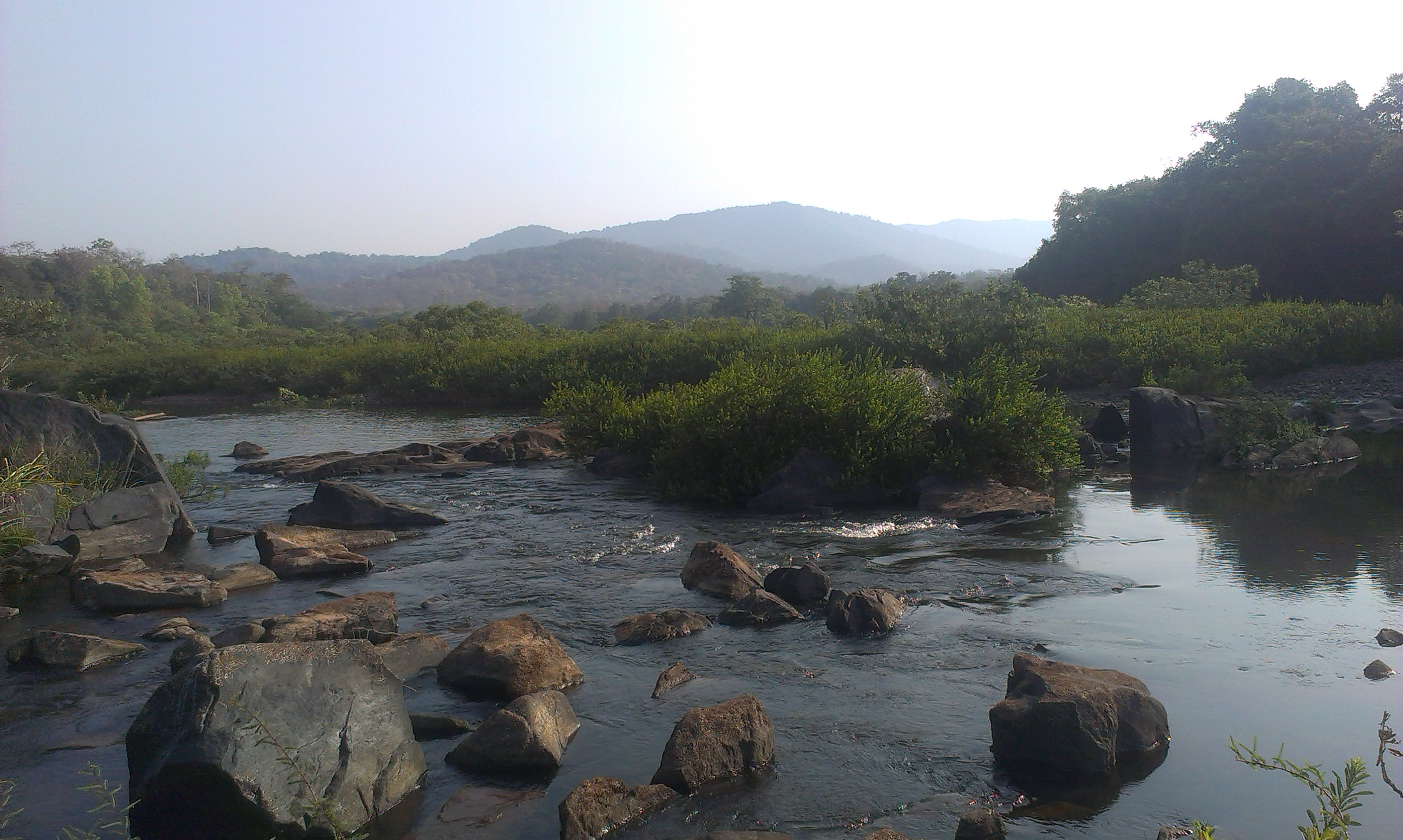
- First Look of Aghanashini River

Location
- Country: India
- State: Karnataka
- Region: Malenadu
- District: Uttara Kannada

Physical characteristics
- Length: 117 km (73 mi)
- Basin size: 1449 km²
- Current Origin: Gadihalli Village, near Sirsi
- Old Origin: Shankara Honda, in Sirsi
- Mouth: Tadri, Belegadde/Kirubele, Kumta, Near Gokarna, to Arabian Sea
- Catchment Region: Uttara Kannada (Kumta, Sirsi, Siddapura, Ankola) and Shimoga (Soraba)
- Elevation: < 0m to 786m (MSL)
- Slope: Up to 119% (Devimane Ghat)

The Aghanashini River (also known as ತದಡಿ ಹೊಳೆ) is a major undammed river flowing through the Uttara Kannada district of Karnataka, India. The river currently originates at Gadihalli Village, near Sirsi, at an altitude of 676 metres above mean sea level. Due to decades of urbanization and climate shifts, the river's geographic origin has shifted approximately 8.4 kilometres from its historical source at Shankara Honda.

The river attains the famous Unchalli Falls on its way. It flows westward before coming into the Arabian Sea near Gokarna at the village of Aghanashini situated just at its mouth. The river mouth lies roughly 29 km south-east of Anjediva Island.

== Rainfall ==
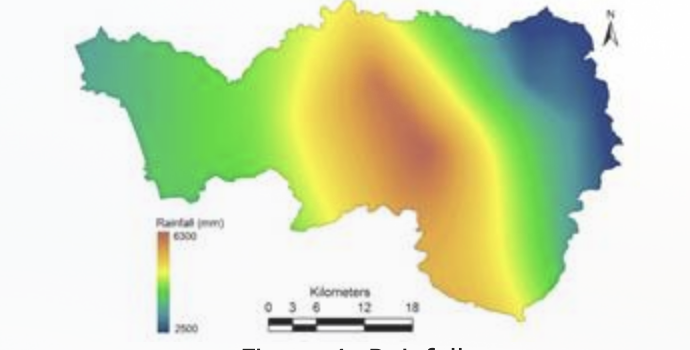
Rainfall Heatmap of Aghanashini River (Done by CES,IISc)

The Aghanashini River catchment has orographic rainfall that varies from 2,500 mm in the plains of Sirsi to over 6,300 mm in the Western Ghats. The annual water yield ranges from 28 to 41 thousand million cubic feet and recently going downward trend due to changing land use within the basin.

== Anthropology ==
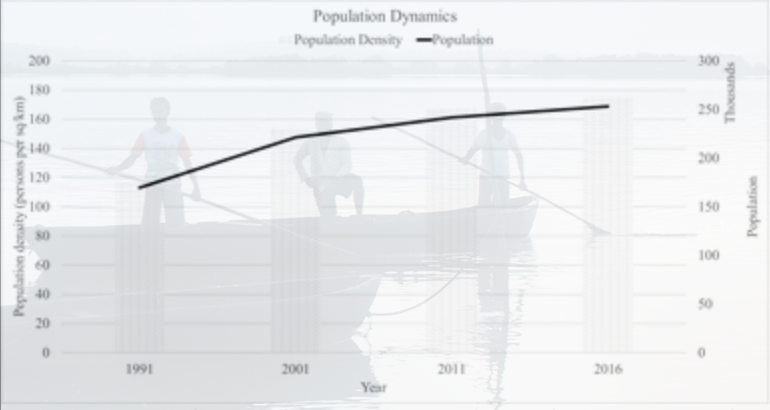
Population dynamics in Aghanashini river catchment (Done by CES,IISc)

The population in the Aghanashini River basin has grown steadily with diverse mix of cultural communities. The catchment area has a steady population growth rate of 9.2% per decade. As per 2001 cencus, there were 221,562 residents, increasing to 241,884 in 2011. The population was projected at 253,135 in 2016. The current population density is 175 people/square kilometres. The basin's population is most concentrated in Sirsi, Gokarna, and Kumta. The communities living in the catchment area have included Havyaka Brahmins and Goud Saraswat Brahmins, Namadhari Naiks and Nadavas, Siddis (a community of African descent), Kurubas and Kumri Maratis, Goudas, Konkanis, Daivajnas, and Muslims.

== History and etymology ==
The word Aghanashini means Destroyer of Sins in Sanskrit. The geological history of the river basin is of approximately 88 million years ago. Mirjan is located along the coastal banks and served as a globally famous trading hub for valuable local Malenadu spices like black pepper and cardamom.

== Culture ==
The local communities surrounding the Aghanashini River basin are deeply tied to the river's ecosystems. A variety of religious and ecological festivals are celebrated across the catchment including Nadi Habba (River Festival), Uura Habba (Village Festival), Bandi Habba and Vadya Panchami. Major community temple fairs include Mahamay Jatra, Durga Devi Jatra, Kannika Parameshwari Jatra, Shantika Parameshwari Jatra, and Venkataramana Jatra. Yakshagana is a classic coastal dance-drama art form famous here. Dynamic local ritual based folk dances are also popular including Suggi Kunitha, Bedara Kunitha, Dhamami Kunitha, and Huli Kunitha. Bharatanatyam, Kolata, Masti Kunitha, Preta Kunitha, and Mandala Kunitha are also popular here as a classical dance form among locals.

The region has a rich musical tradition including Garatiya Haadu, Halliya Haadu, Nadapadagalu, Bingina Pada, Gumatepada, Jogavve Haadu, Jogi Pada, Badi Vadya, and Doni Pada. Lot of native household pastime games are popular among locals including Chowkabara, Kavade, Channe Mane, Tabalamane, Kallata, Karu Aata, Katte Aata, Hulighatta, Bandi Aata, Devarata, Sariya Mugila Aata and Achchu Aata.

Many popular temples are present throughout the basin including Venkateshwara Temple (Majguni), Gokarna, Babbru Lingeshwara Temple and Devimane.

== Agriculture and irrigation ==
The fertile soil and high rainfall of the Aghanashini River catchment area supports traditional tropical crops, staple grains, and high-value spices including a wide variety of local paddy (rice) crops, sugarcane, areca nut (betel nut), black pepper and cardamom. Coconut groves, banana plantations, and local mango orchards are also locally popular fruits here.

== Land usage dynamics ==
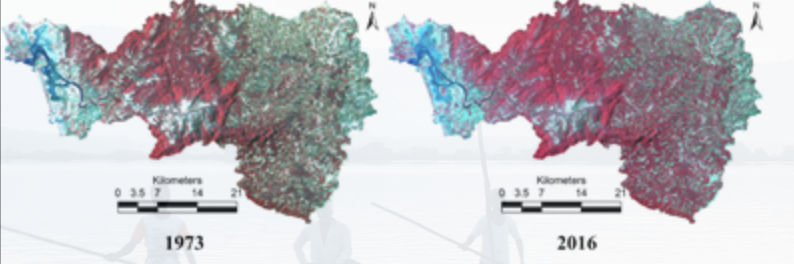
False colour composite (FCC) of the River basin (Done by CES,IISc)

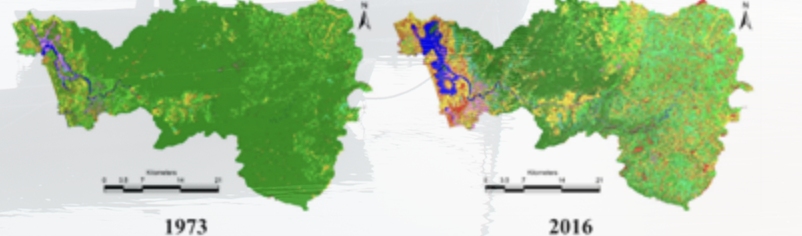
Land usage dynamics in Aghanashini Catchment (Done by CES,IISc)

Historical data from 1973 to 2016 indicates a steady reduction in the basin's natural forest cover.

=== Decadal land use percentages (1973–2016) ===
Land Use Category	1973 Share (%)	2016 Share (%)
Evergreen / Semi-Evergreen Forest	73.05%	27.73%
Moist Deciduous Forest	9.63%	20.41%
Crop Land	4.05%	16.26%
Arecanut / Coconut Plantations	3.55%	9.22%
Teak / Bamboo / Cashew Plantations	0.49%	7.90%
Built-up Area (Urban/Settlements)	0.08%	4.81%
Scrub / Grass Land	3.92%	4.01%
Open Space	1.43%	3.44%
Acacia / Eucalyptus / Casuarina Plantations	2.86%	2.91%
Water Bodies	0.80%	2.76%
Dry Deciduous Forest	0.14%	0.57%

== Biodiversity ==
The natural flow of the river creates a fish habitat. The annual fish harvest from the estuary generates over ₹43 crore for the local economy. Edible clams, oysters, and mussels generate an annual harvest valued over ₹5 crore.

Tiger, Black Panther, Leopard, Gaur (Indian Bison), Sloth Bear, Wild Boar, Hare, Bonnet macaque, Lion-tailed macaque, Hanuman Langur, Indian giant squirrel and various deer species are present in the forests growing throughout the basin. The wetlands and woods support a variety of snakes including the King cobra, Indian Cobra, Vipers, Kraits, Pythons, Rat Snakes, and Monitor lizard. The estuary has over 50 recorded fish species including marine and estuarine varieties such as Ambassis commersoni, Apogon hyalosoma, Arius arius, Etroplus suratensis (Pearlspot), Lates calcarifer (Barramundi), Mugil cephalus (Flathead Grey Mullet), Pampus argenteus (Silver Pomfret), and Rastrelliger kanagurta (Indian Mackerel). Various species of mayflies including Baetis, Caenis, Choroterpes, caddisflies (Hydropsyche), stoneflies (Neoperla), and dragonflies are also present.

Key native tree and plant species include Teak (Tectona grandis), Mango (Mangifera indica), Indian Copal (Vateria indica), Malabar Plum (Syzygium cumini), Rosewood (Dalbergia latifolia), Wild Jack (Artocarpus hirsutus), Jackfruit (Artocarpus heterophyllus), Indian Gooseberry (Emblica officinalis), Fish-tail Palm (Caryota urens), and various wild nutmegs (Myristica). Garcinia indica (Kokum), Cinnamomum verum (Cinnamon), Calophyllum tomentosum, and the unique Semecarpus kathlekanensis found in sacred swamps.
