= Banavasi =

Tourist destination near Sirsi, Karnataka

- Village
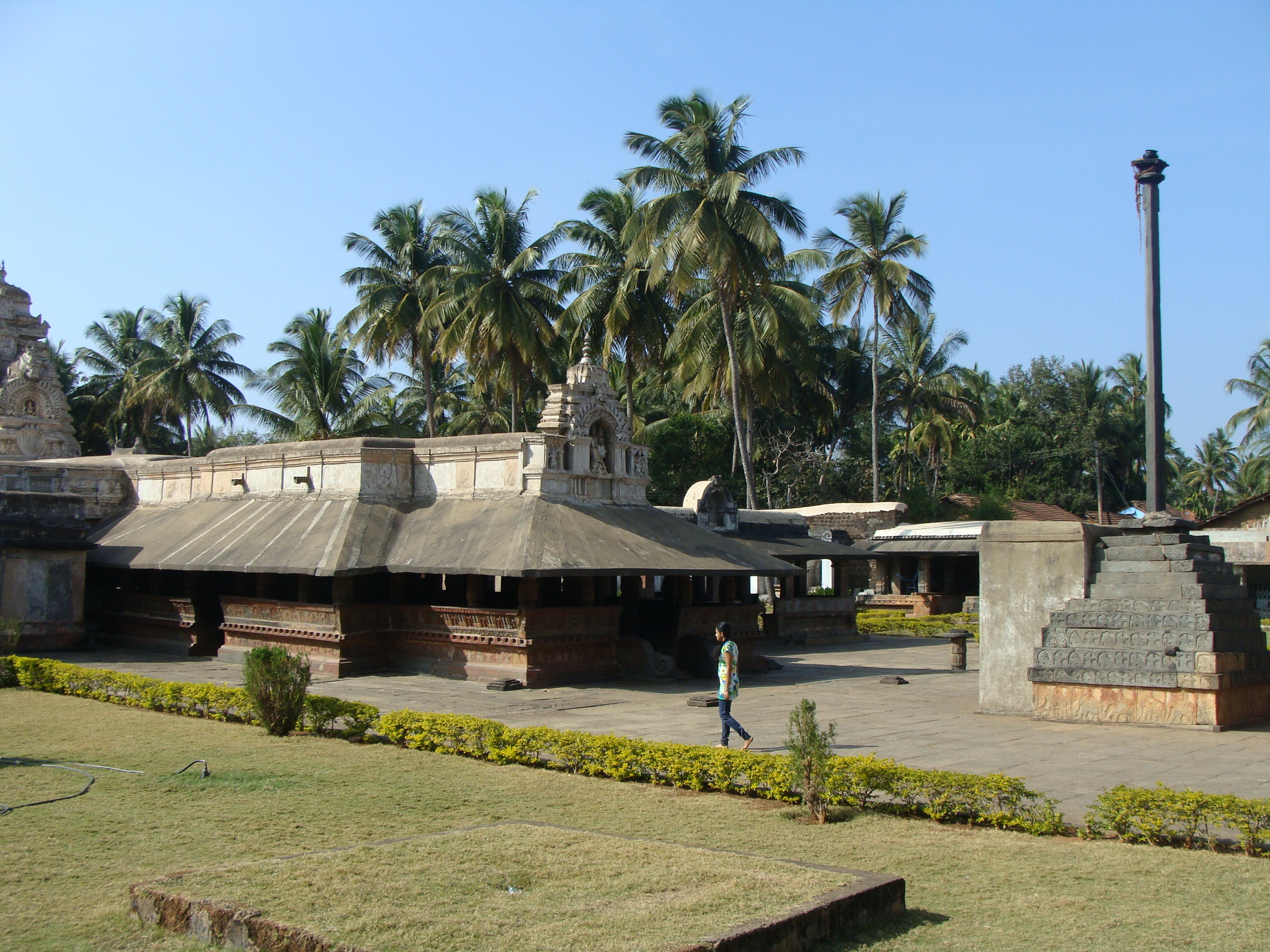
- Madhukeshwara Temple at Banavasi

- Location in Karnataka, India
- Coordinates: 14.5341°N 75.0177°E
- Country: India
- State: Karnataka
- District: Uttara Kannada
- Taluq: Sirsi
- Nearest Large City: Sirsi

Population (2005)
  - Total: 4,267

Languages
  - Official: Kannada
- Time zone: UTC+5:30 (IST)
- PIN: 581 318
- Telephone code: 08384
- Vehicle registration: Sirsi KA-31

Banavāsi is an ancient temple town located near Sirsi in Karnataka. Banavasi was the ancient capital of the Kadamba dynasty that ruled all of modern-day Karnataka state. They were the first native empire to bring Kannada and Karnataka to prominence. It is 24 km (15 mi) away from its nearest large city Sirsi through SH 77.

== History ==
Banavasi is one of the oldest towns in the Karnataka state. It has grown up around the Madhukeshwara Temple built in the 5th century and dedicated to Shiva the supreme God in Shaivism, a major branch of Hinduism.

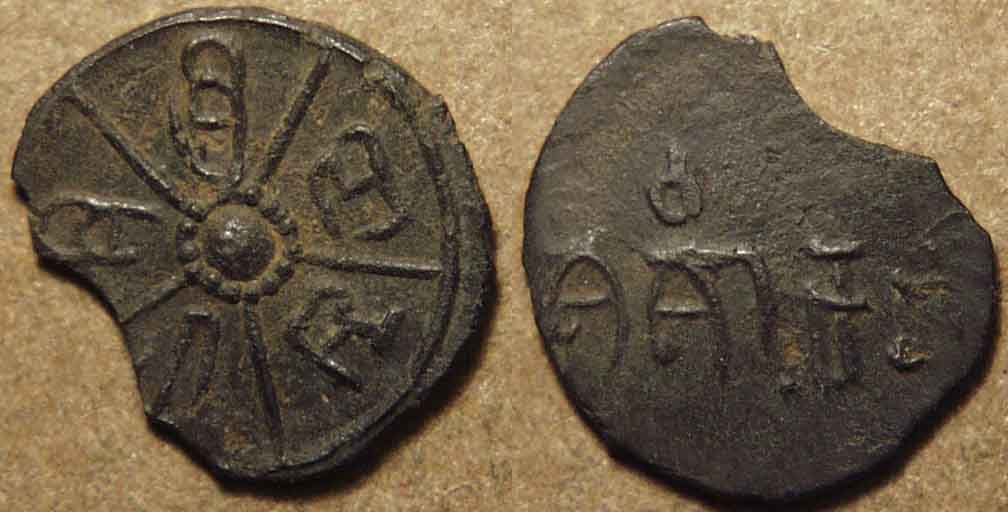
Coin of the Kadamba king who calls himself on the coin "sri dosharashi," thought to be Krishnavarma II (ruled c. 516-540). The reverse of the coin has the legend shashanka, which means "moon." The Kannada letters and another coin can be seen in the entry for Kadambas of Banavasi

5th-century copper coin was discovered here with an inscription in the Kannada script, one of the oldest such coins ever discovered.

Ādikavi Pampa, the first poet of Kannada, wrote his epics in Banavasi.

The town once was the capital of the Kadamba rulers, an ancient royal dynasty of Karnataka. They established themselves there in 345 CE and ruled South India for at least two centuries.

== See also ==
- Banavasi.in (Official Website)
- Kadambas of Banavasi
- Banavasi Madhukeshwara Temple
