= Yana, India =

Village and geological site in Karnataka

Yana
- Village
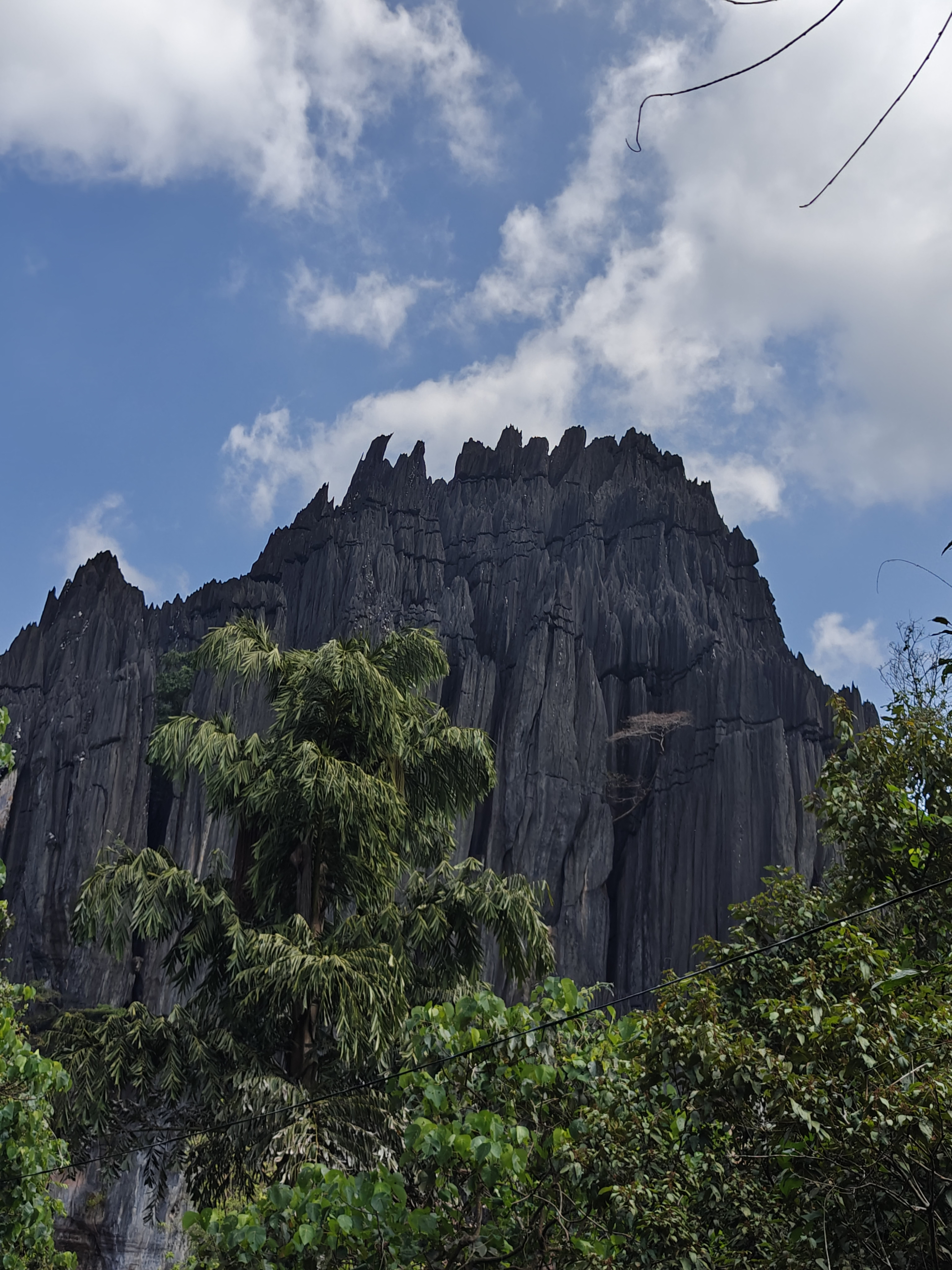
- Yana Caves

- Location within Karnataka Location within India
- Coordinates: 14.5897°N 74.56625°E
- Country: India
- State: Karnataka
- District: Uttara Kannada

Population (2011)
  - Total: 495

Languages
  - Official: Kannada
- Time zone: UTC+5:30 (IST)
- PIN: 581362

National Geological Monuments of India
- Official name: Yana Caves
- Designated: 2026
- Designated by: Geological Survey of India

Yana is a village and a geological site in Uttara Kannada district of the Indian state of Karnataka. There are several karst formations in the region, and prominent among them are the two rocky outcrops on the outskirts of the village, known as Bhairaveshwara Shikhara and the Mohini Shikhara. The site was declared as National Geological Monument by the Geological Survey of India in 2026. There is a temple dedicated to Bhaireveshwara, a form of Shiva in Hinduism.

== Geography ==
Yana lies amongst the Western Ghats in the Uttara Kannada district of the Indian state of Karnataka. There are about 61 recorded karst formations and other associated landforms such as caverns and sinkholes in a 3 km (1.9 mi) radius surrounding Yana. Prominent among these are the two massive rock outcrops known as Bhairaveshwara Shikhara and the Mohini Shikhara, which are 120 m (390 ft) and 90 m (300 ft) high respectively.

The karstification of the dolomite and limestone structures began during the Precambrian dating to about 2.7 Ga. They were formed by weathering and erosion of the underlying rocks by percolating rainwater, and further shaped by tectonic processes. In the 2000s, there were requests from the people of the region to declare Yana as a heritage site and a protected area under the Biodiversity Preservation Act 2002. The site was declared as National Geological Monument by the Geological Survey of India in 2026.

== Mythology and religion ==
As per local lore, the site is associated with the story of Bhasmasura. Bhasmasura was an asura, who after great penance, obtained a power from Shiva, that turned to ashes anybody on whose head he placed his hand. However, the evil minded asura tried to rest the effectiveness of the boon on Shiva himself, and Shiva hid himself in the rocks at Yana to escape from him. Vishnu took the form of Mohini and enticed Bhasmasura with her beauty. Infatuated by Mohini, he agreed to a dance competition with her. During the dance competition, seduced by Mohini, Bhasmasura unknowingly kept his hand on his own head, and was turned into ashes. As per legend, the intense heat generated by this act resulted blackened these limestone rocks. Locals believe that the loose black soil located around the site as remnants of the ashes of Bhasmasura.

There is a temple dedicated to Bhaireveshwara, a form of Shiva below the Bhairaveshwara Shikhara. The idol is considered to be a Swayambhu ("self-manifested") with water dripping on top of it from the roof. There is a linga, and bronze statues of Ganga and Chandika in nearby caves. The linga is a natural form created by the stalactites and stalagmites in limestone formations. During Maha Shivaratri, annual festivities are held here for 10 days.

== Demographics ==
As per the 2011 Census of India, Yana had a population of 495 inhabitants of which 256 were males and 239 were females. About 58 (11.7%) of the population was under the age of six years. The literacy rate of Yana was 88.3%, higher than the average of the state (75.4%). Male literacy rate was 93% while female literacy was 83.1%. Yana is a village panchayat and is headed by a panchayat president.

== Transportation ==
Yana can be accessed by a 17 km (11 mi) mud road from Kathagala, located on the highway connecting Kumta and Sirsi. It can also be reached on foot from Sundholle, located 3 km (1.9 mi) away. A single bus operated by the state government runs between Kumta and Yana. The nearest railhead is located at Kumta and the nearest airport is the Hubli Airport.
