= Sirsi, Karnataka =

City in Karnataka, India

Sirsi
- City
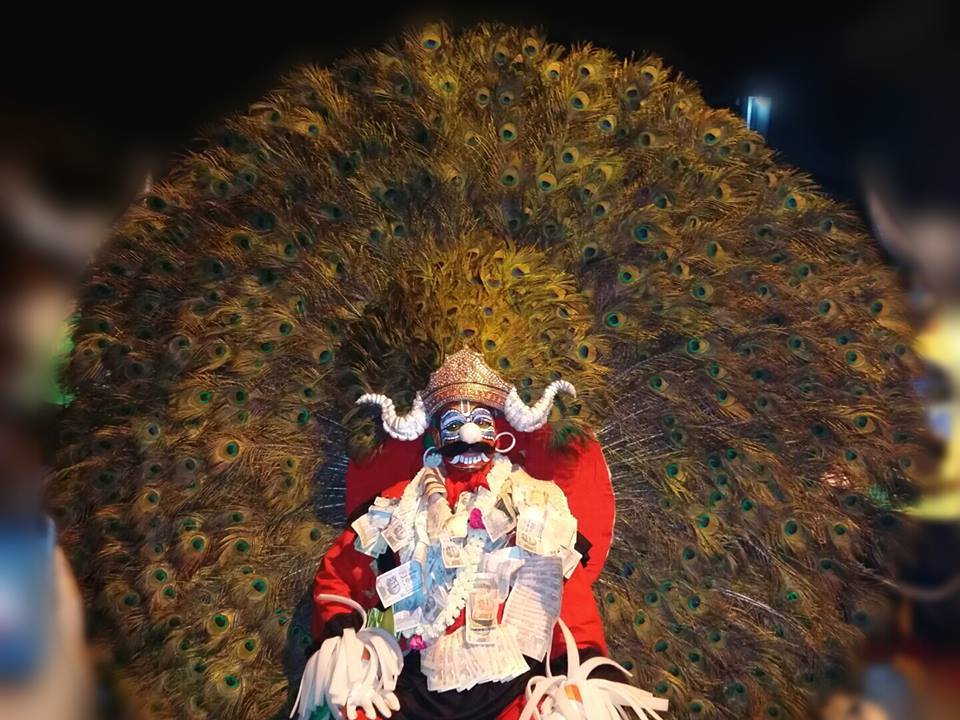
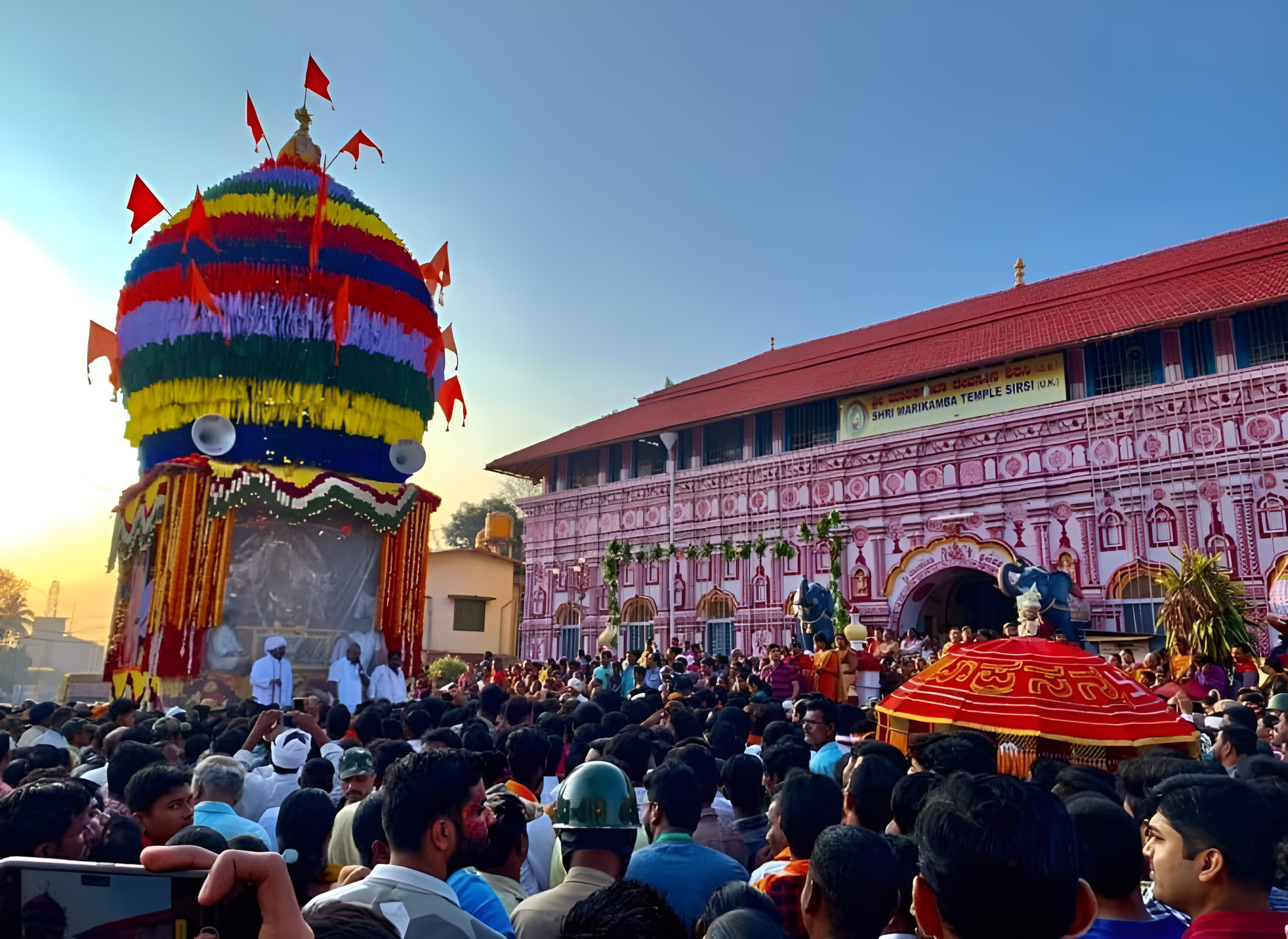
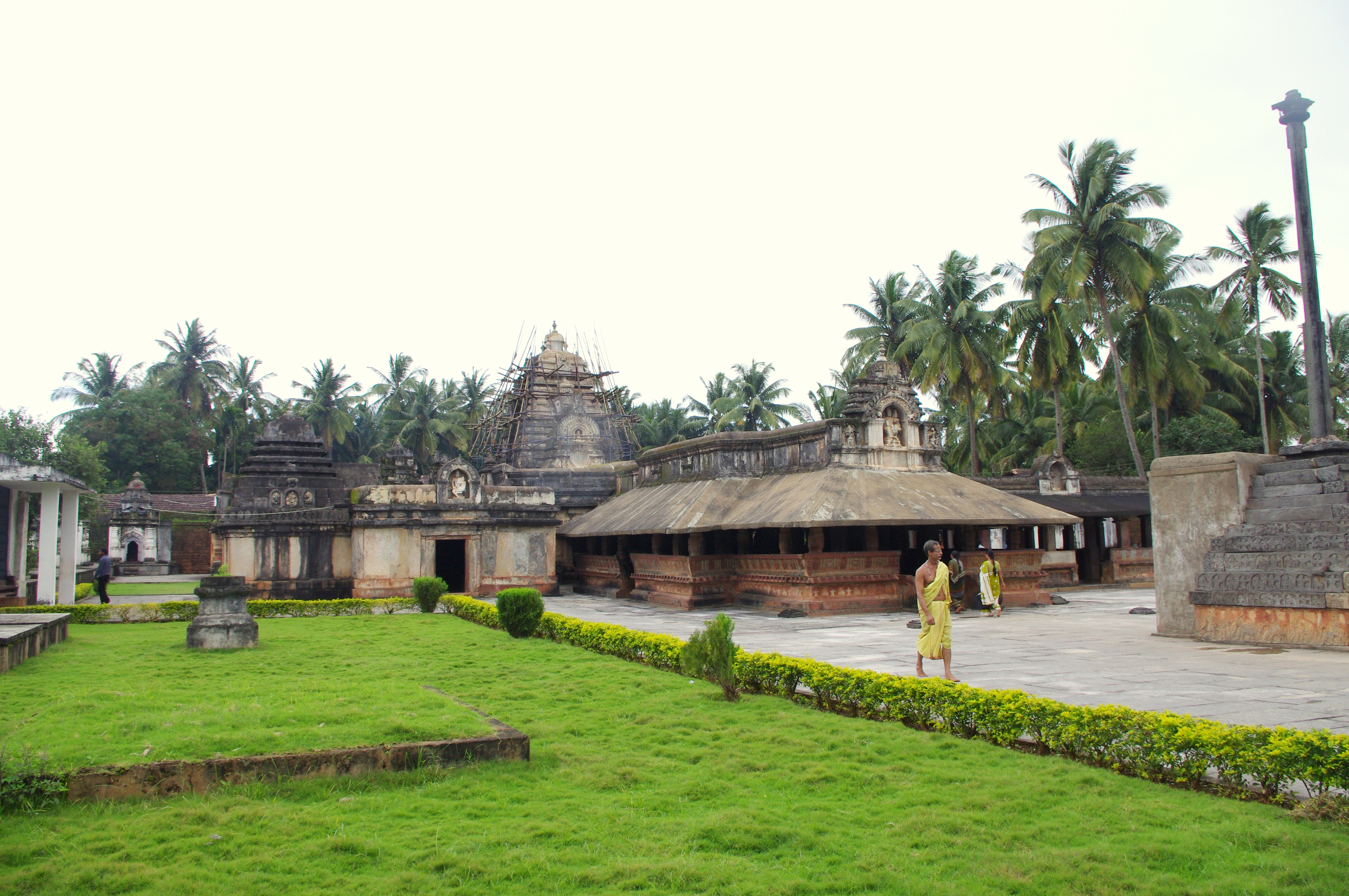
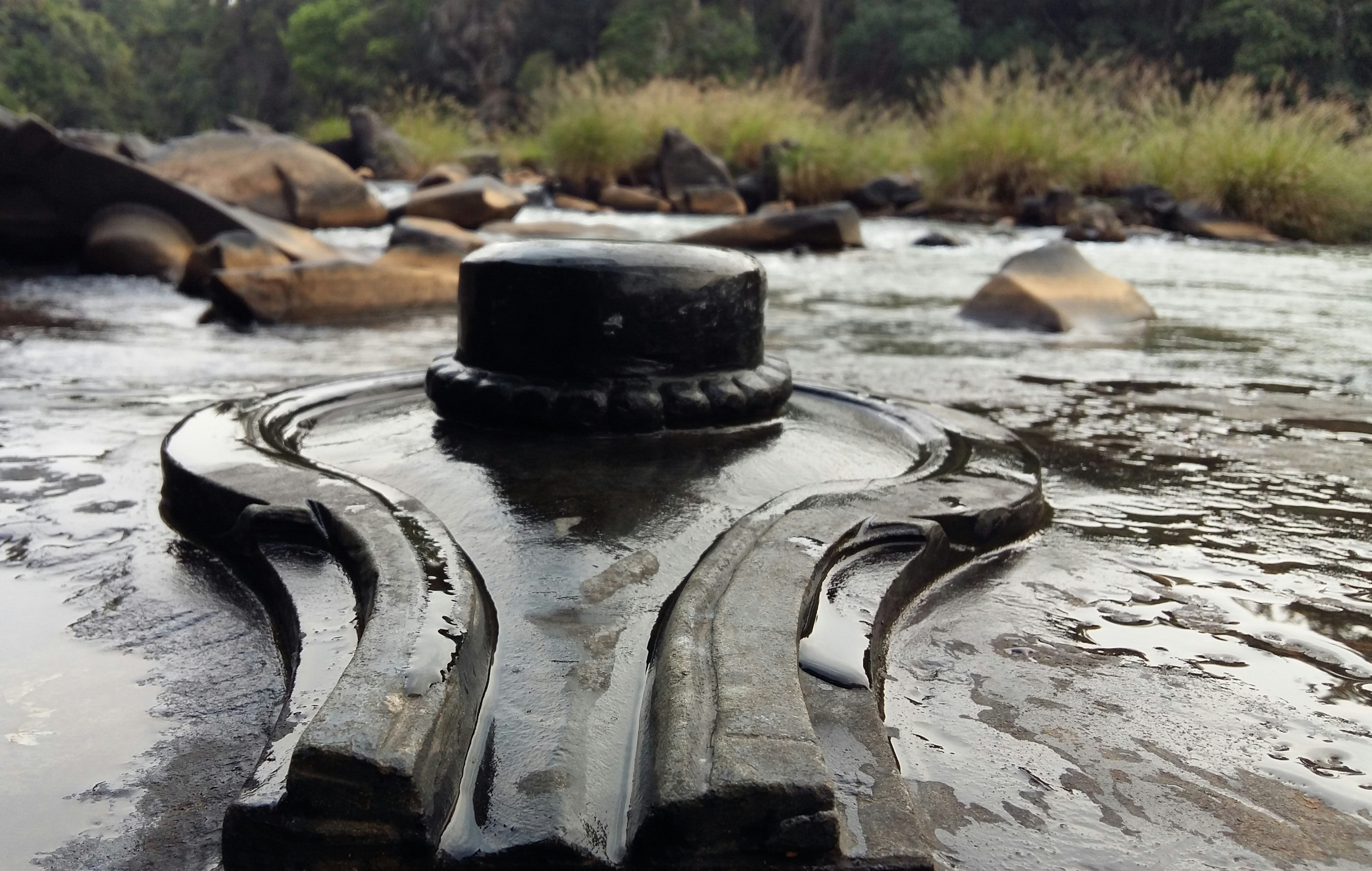
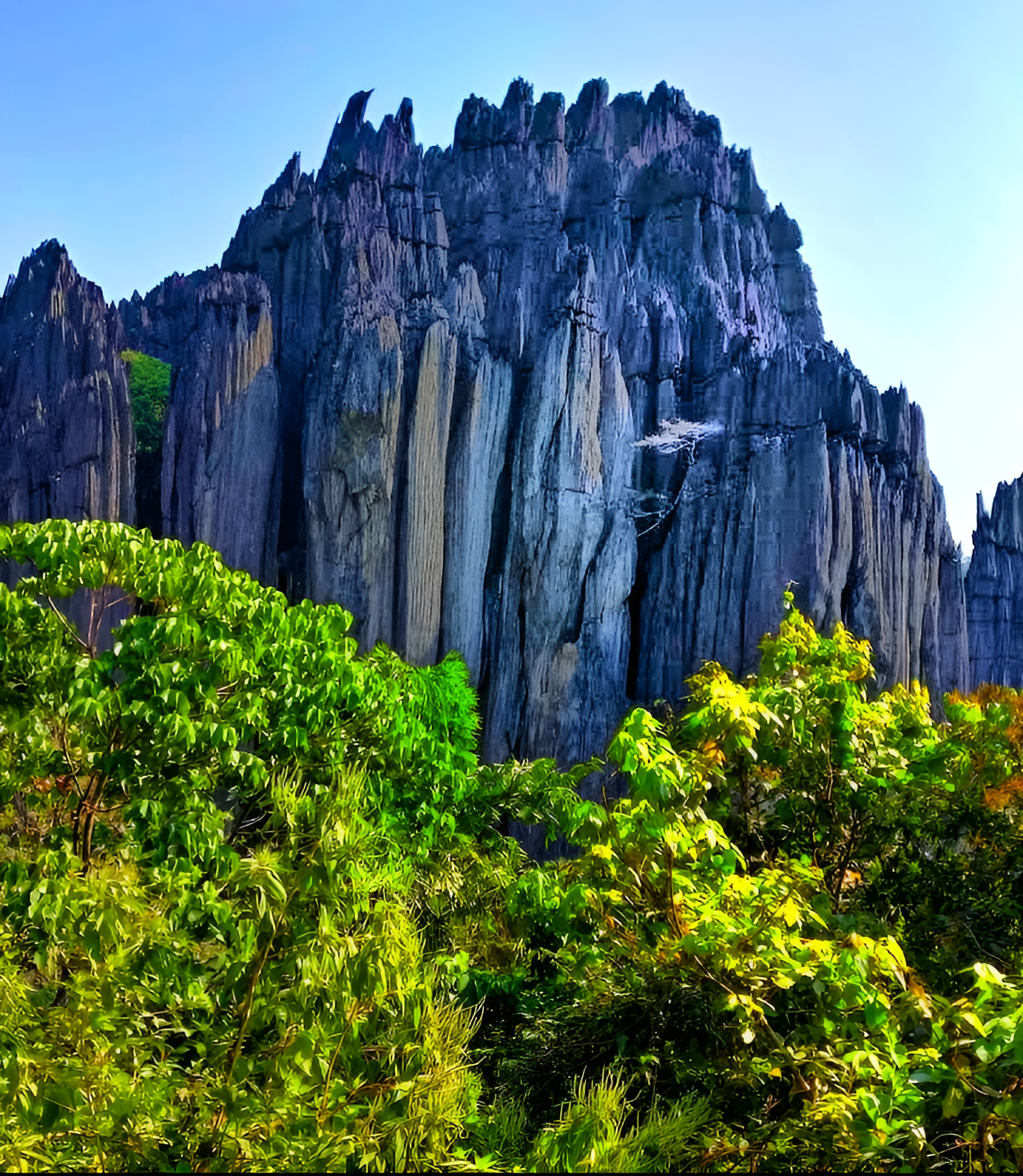
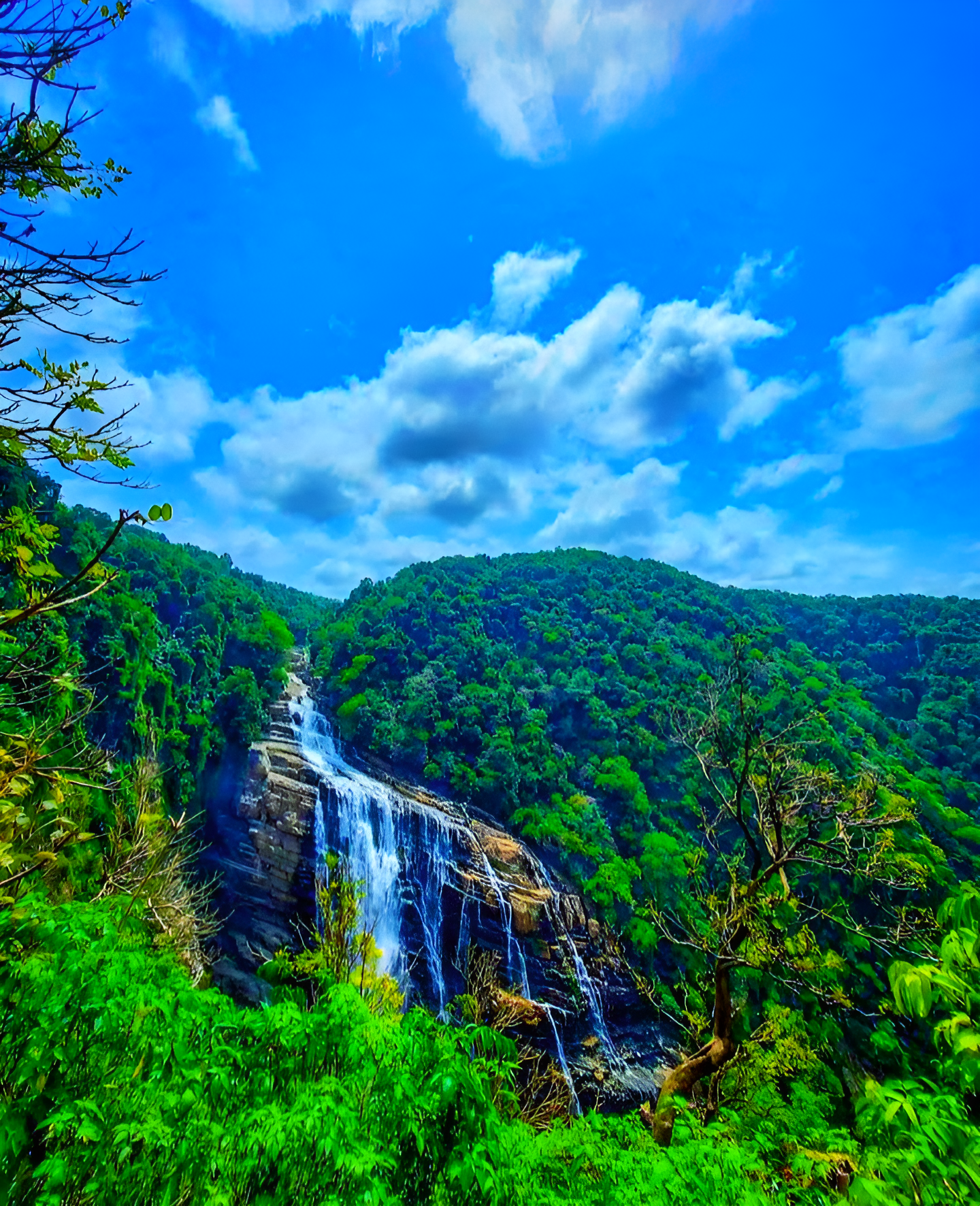
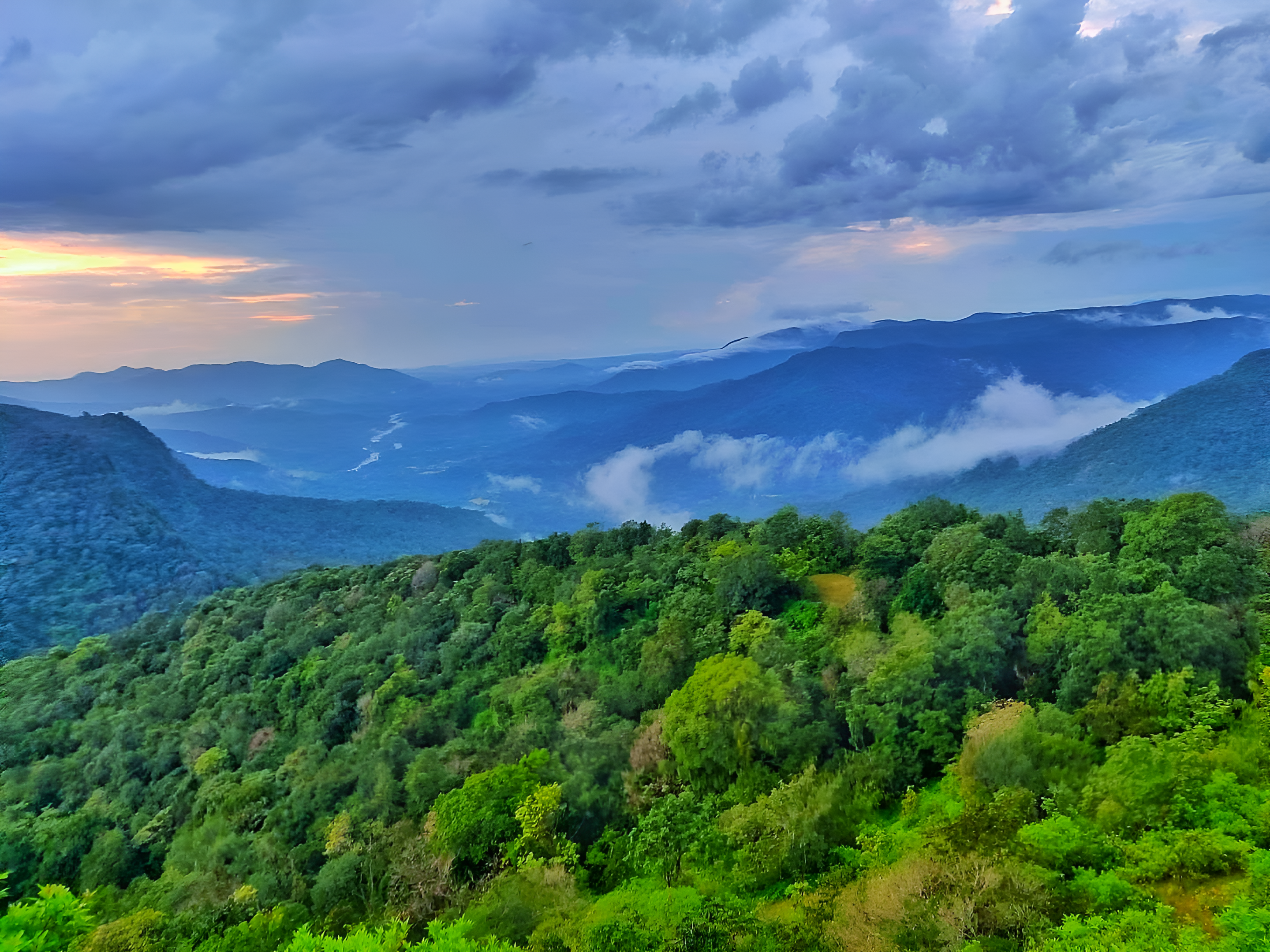
- Bedara Vesha Sirsi Fair Banavasi Sahasralinga Yana Unchalli Falls Bhimanagudda
- Sirsi in Karnataka
- Coordinates: 14°37′10″N 74°50′15″E
- Grid position: MK74
- Country: India
- State: Karnataka
- District: Uttara Kannada
- Named for: Siris tree

Government
  - Body: City Municipal Council
  - MLA: Bhimanna T. Naik
  - MP: Vishweshwar Hegde Kageri

Area
  - Urban: 13.2 km^{2} (5.1 sq mi)
  - Rural: 1,316 km^{2} (508 sq mi)
- Elevation: 611 m (2,005 ft)

Population (2011)
  - City: 62,882
  - Rural: 124,026
  - Total: 186,908
- Demonyms: Sirsians
- Time zone: UTC+5:30 (IST)
- PIN: 581401, 581402
- Telephone code: +91-8384
- Vehicle registration: KA-31
- Official language: Kannada
- Urban Literacy: 92.82%
- Rural Literacy: 85.64%
- Taluk Average Literacy: 88.05%
- Climate: Tropical monsoon climate
- Website: sirsicity.mrc.gov.in

Sirsi or Shirasi is a city located in the Uttara Kannada district of Karnataka state in India. Administratively, Sirsi functions as the headquarters for the eponymous taluk, subdivision, and educational district. The Sirsi subdivision comprises four taluks: Sirsi, Siddapur, Yellapur, and Mundgod. The broader Sirsi Educational District encompasses these four, along with the taluks of Joida, Dandeli, and Haliyal.

The primary cash crop cultivated in the surrounding rural areas is the areca nut locally referred to as Adike (or supāri). Notably, the 'Sirsi Supari' variety of areca nut, grown in the Sirsi subdivision, has been accorded the Geographical Indication (GI) Tag.

The area is also renowned for its cultivation of various spices, including cardamom, pepper, betel leaves, and vanilla. Rice constitutes the principal food crop grown here. The Spices Board of India lists the prices of black pepper from Sirsi and Kochi, making them the only two markets officially designated as primary price reference centers for the black pepper in India.

== Etymology ==
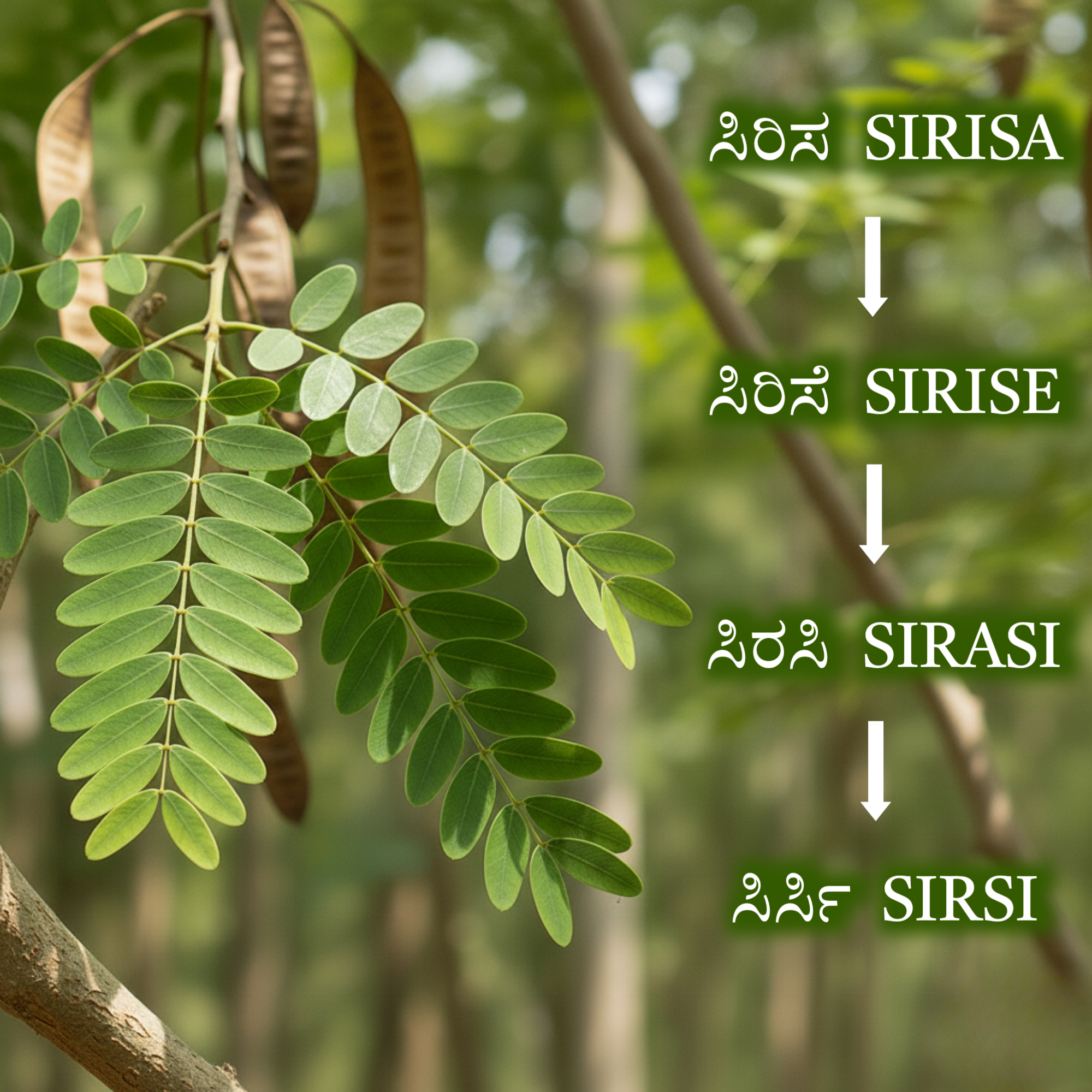

The city was originally named as Sirise because of the abundance of siris trees (sirisa in Kannada) that were commonly found in this region. Over a time, the name evolved into Sirasi and eventually came into common usage as Sirsi. The earliest mention of the name "Sirise" dates back to an inscription found on a hero-stone at Tamadi Kallala (Siddapura taluk) from 1150 AD.

During the reign of the Sonda rulers, Sirsi was also known by the name Kalyana Pattana.

== Geography ==
Map of Sirsi Taluk

Sirsi is located at 14.6207°N 74.8355°E in the Uttara Kannada district of Karnataka, within the central Western Ghats. The town lies at an average elevation of about 611 m (2,005 ft) above sea level and is characterized by undulating terrain consisting of lateritic plateaus, forested hills, and narrow valleys.

Geologically, the region forms part of the Dharwar Craton and is composed predominantly of schists, banded gneiss, and granite gneiss, overlain by extensive lateritic formations resulting from prolonged tropical weathering. The soils in the area are derived from these parent rocks and are typically clayey to clayey-skeletal in texture, varying with topography and depth.

Sirsi lies within the catchment of the Aghanashini River, a west-flowing river that originates near Shankara Honda in the Sirsi Town and flows approximately 128 km before draining into the Arabian Sea. The river basin covers an area of about 1,449 km² and remains one of the few largely free-flowing river systems in peninsular India.

The region experiences significant orographic influence due to its location on the windward side of the Western Ghats, resulting in high rainfall and the formation of numerous perennial and seasonal streams. Sirsi taluk has a high proportion of forest cover, accounting for approximately 78.1% of its total geographical area, with vegetation consisting mainly of tropical semi-evergreen and moist deciduous forests.

Sirsi forms part of the Western Ghats biodiversity hotspot, which is recognized for its high levels of endemism and ecological significance.

A notable research location within Sirsi taluk is Janmane, a forested area situated approximately 14 km southwest of Sirsi along the Sirsi–Kumta road. The area hosts a field research station operated by the National Centre for Biological Sciences (NCBS), which serves as a base for ecological and biodiversity studies in the central Western Ghats.

Janmane lies within a high-rainfall zone of the Western Ghats, receiving an average annual rainfall of around 4,300 mm, primarily during the southwest monsoon. The region is characterized by tropical evergreen and semi-evergreen forests and supports a wide range of endemic flora and fauna, reflecting the ecological richness of the central Western Ghats landscape.

== Climate ==
Sirsi has a tropical monsoon climate (Am) characterized by warm temperatures throughout the year and pronounced seasonal rainfall. Based on long-term averages (1981–2020), the annual mean temperature is approximately 24.4 °C (75.9 °F).

Mean daily maximum temperatures range from around 25 °C (77 °F) in July–August to 34.1 °C (93.4 °F) in April, while mean daily minimum temperatures range from about 15.2 °C (59.4 °F) in January to 22.8 °C (73.0 °F) in May.

The climate is strongly influenced by the southwest monsoon. Rainfall is highly seasonal, with the majority occurring between June and September. July is the wettest month, receiving about 971 mm (38.2 in) of rainfall on average, followed by August and June. The annual rainfall is approximately 2,635 mm (103.7 in), placing Sirsi within the high-rainfall belt of the Western Ghats and among the wetter regions of Uttara Kannada district.

The temperature values presented are based on gridded estimates at an approximate elevation of 518 m (1,699 ft). As this is lower than Sirsi’s actual elevation, the recorded temperatures may be marginally higher than true local conditions. Rainfall patterns, however, are consistent with high-rainfall windward regions of the Western Ghats.

Sirsi, India

Climate chart (precipitation, max. and min. temperature)
J	F	M	A	M	J	J	A	S	O	N	D
1.9 30 15	1.4 32 17	5.3 33 20	24 34 22	76 34 23	544 26 22	971 25 22	624 25 21	204 27 21	135 28 20	41 28 17	8.1 28 16
- █ Average max. and min. temperatures in °C
- █ Precipitation totals in mm
- Source: IMD (rainfall), NASA POWER (temperature, 1981–2020)
Imperial conversion
J	F	M	A	M	J	J	A	S	O	N	D
0.1 86 59	0.1 90 62	0.2 92 67	0.9 93 71	3 93 73	21 79 72	38 76 71	25 77 70	8 81 69	5.3 82 68	1.6 82 63	0.3 82 60
- █ Average max. and min. temperatures in °F
- █ Precipitation totals in inches

Climate data for Sirsi, Karnataka, India (approx. elevation: 518m asl)
Month	Jan	Feb	Mar	Apr	May	Jun	Jul	Aug	Sep	Oct	Nov	Dec	Year
Mean daily maximum °C (°F)	30.20 (86.36)	31.98 (89.56)	33.27 (91.89)	34.11 (93.40)	33.99 (93.18)	26.09 (78.96)	24.54 (76.17)	24.84 (76.71)	27.17 (80.91)	27.60 (81.68)	27.60 (81.68)	28.02 (82.44)	29.12 (84.41)
Mean daily minimum °C (°F)	15.02 (59.04)	16.53 (61.75)	19.52 (67.14)	21.87 (71.37)	22.79 (73.02)	22.14 (71.85)	21.71 (71.08)	21.32 (70.38)	20.71 (69.28)	19.73 (67.51)	17.33 (63.19)	15.50 (59.90)	19.68 (67.42)
Average rainfall mm (inches)	5 (0.2)	1.2 (0.05)	11.7 (0.46)	36.2 (1.43)	87 (3.4)	522.1 (20.56)	902.7 (35.54)	593.9 (23.38)	275 (10.8)	174.5 (6.87)	48 (1.9)	7.4 (0.29)	2,664.7 (104.88)
Average rainy days	1	1	3	11	17	29	31	30	26	21	9	3	182
Average relative humidity (%) (at 17:30 IST)	62.09	54.21	53.61	59.99	70.02	86.05	89.60	90.24	89.44	86.83	80.37	71.85	74.53
Source: IMD (rainfall), Directorate of Economics and Statistics, KSNDMC, NASA POWER (temperature, humidity, 1981–2020) Temperature data derived from NASA POWER gridded dataset (1981–2020), which uses interpolated elevation grids rather than exact station elevation. Average Monthly Rainfall data taken from Directorate of Economics and Statistics Karnataka (1995 - 2023), KSNDMC (2024-2025)

== Demographics ==
Religion in Sirsi
	Percent
Hinduism	70.71%
Islam	24.18%
Christianity	4.93%
Jainism	0.13%
Others†	0.02%
Distribution of religions

As of 2011, the population of Sirsi within town limits was 62,335. Males constituted 51% of the population and females 49%. Sirsi had an average literacy rate of 92.82%, which was much higher than the national average of 74.05%. Male literacy was 95.26%, and female literacy 90.43%. About 12% of the population was under 6 years of age. In Sirsi City Municipal Council, the female sex ratio was 1014, whereas the state average in Karnataka was 973.

== Art and culture ==
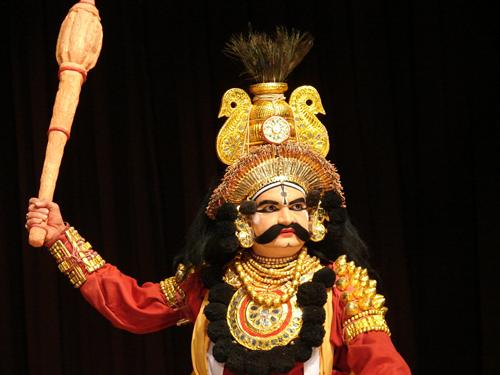
Yakshagana artist with Kirita depicts King

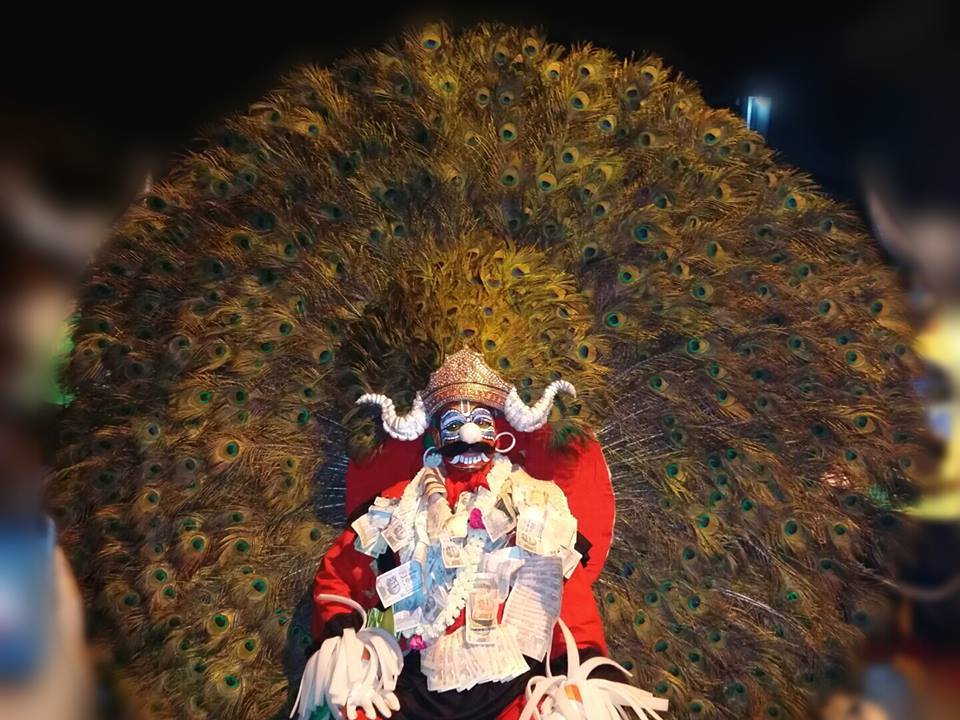
Bedara Vesha artist

Yakshagana is a classical dance drama common to the state of Karnataka mainly in the districts of Uttara Kannada, Shivamogga, Udupi, Dakshina Kannada and Kasaragod district of Kerala. There are several Yakshagana artists in and around Sirsi where it is regularly performed. Traditionally, Yakshaganas used to start late at night and run through the entire night. Bhagavatha along with background musicians who play Chande and Maddale forms himmela. The actors, in colourful costumes, enact various roles in the story forms Mummela. Yakshagana is sometimes simply called as Aataā (meaning play) in both Konkani and Kannada. Yaksha-gana literally means the song (gāna) of a Yaksha. Yakshas were an exotic tribe mentioned in the Sanskrit literature of ancient India.

In Sirsi, Holi is celebrated with a unique Carnival. Folk dance called "Bedara Vesha" is performed during the five nights proceeding the festival day. Also known as The Hunter Dance, it is performed every alternate year in the town and attracts a large crowd on all the five days from different parts of India.

Dollu Kunitha is another folk dance of Sirsi performed during Bedara Vesha and Marikamba Fair.

== Sirsi Supari ==
Arecanut is extensively grown in this region. The arecanut grown in Sirsi has unique features like a round and flattened coin shape, particular texture, size, cross-sectional views, and taste, among others. Its average dry weight is 7.5 g and average thickness is 16 mm. This unique arecanut has secured a GI tag.

== Sirsi Educational District ==
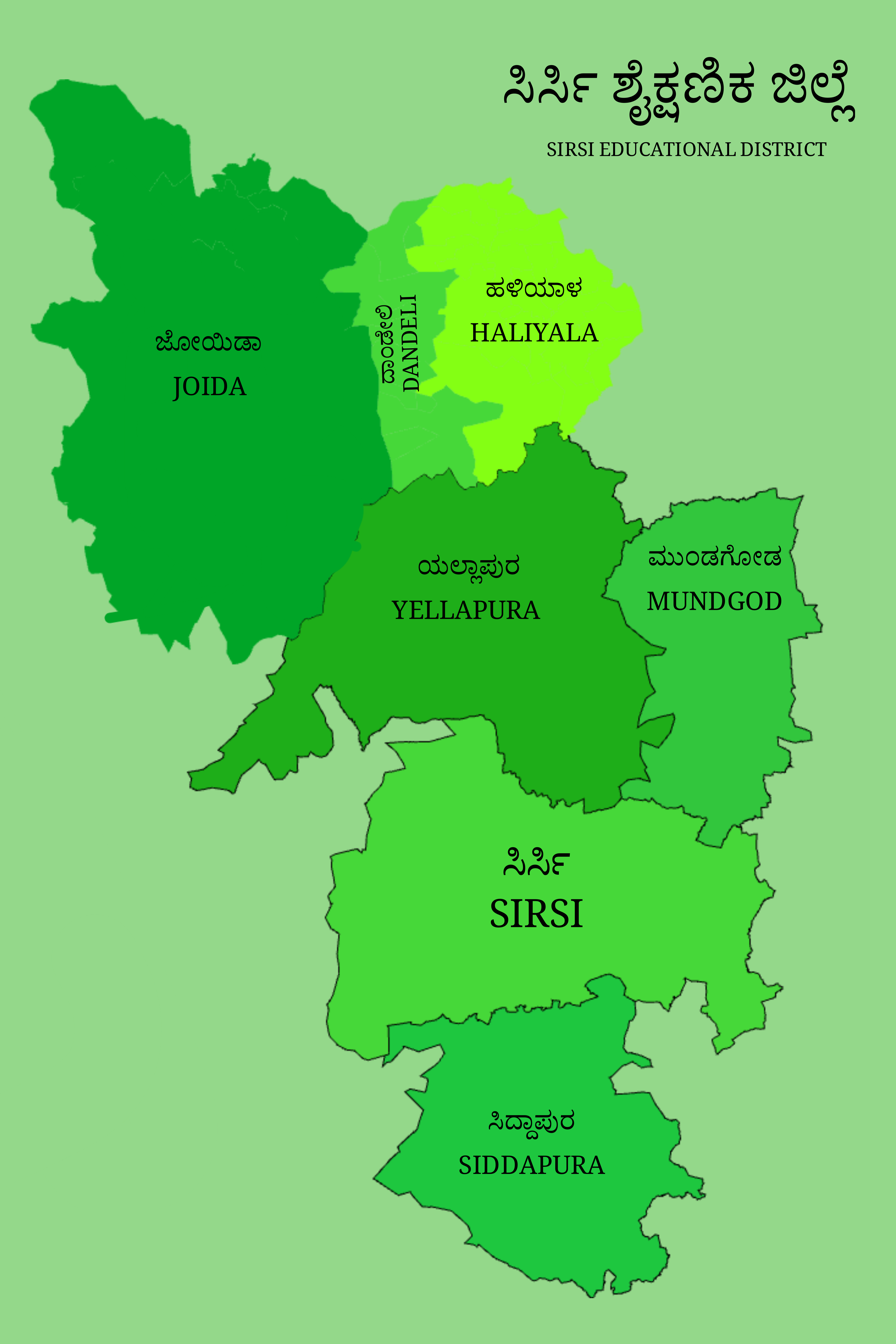
Sirsi Educational District

The Sirsi Educational District (ಸಿರ್ಸಿ ಶೈಕ್ಷಣಿಕ ಜಿಲ್ಲೆ) is created by the State Government in 2009. It became the 34th educational district in Karnataka, with the primary goal of enhancing the management and delivery of primary and secondary education within the region. The district is headquartered in Sirsi, The establishment of this district was part of an effort to improve access to quality education in this unique, geographically vast region. It governs various government, aided, and private schools across its blocks, which include Sirsi, Siddapur, Mundagod, Yellapur, Joida, Dandeli, and Haliyal. It achieved a remarkably higher rate of 98.3% school admission rate of its target students as of 2021.

== Sirsi City Municipal Council ==
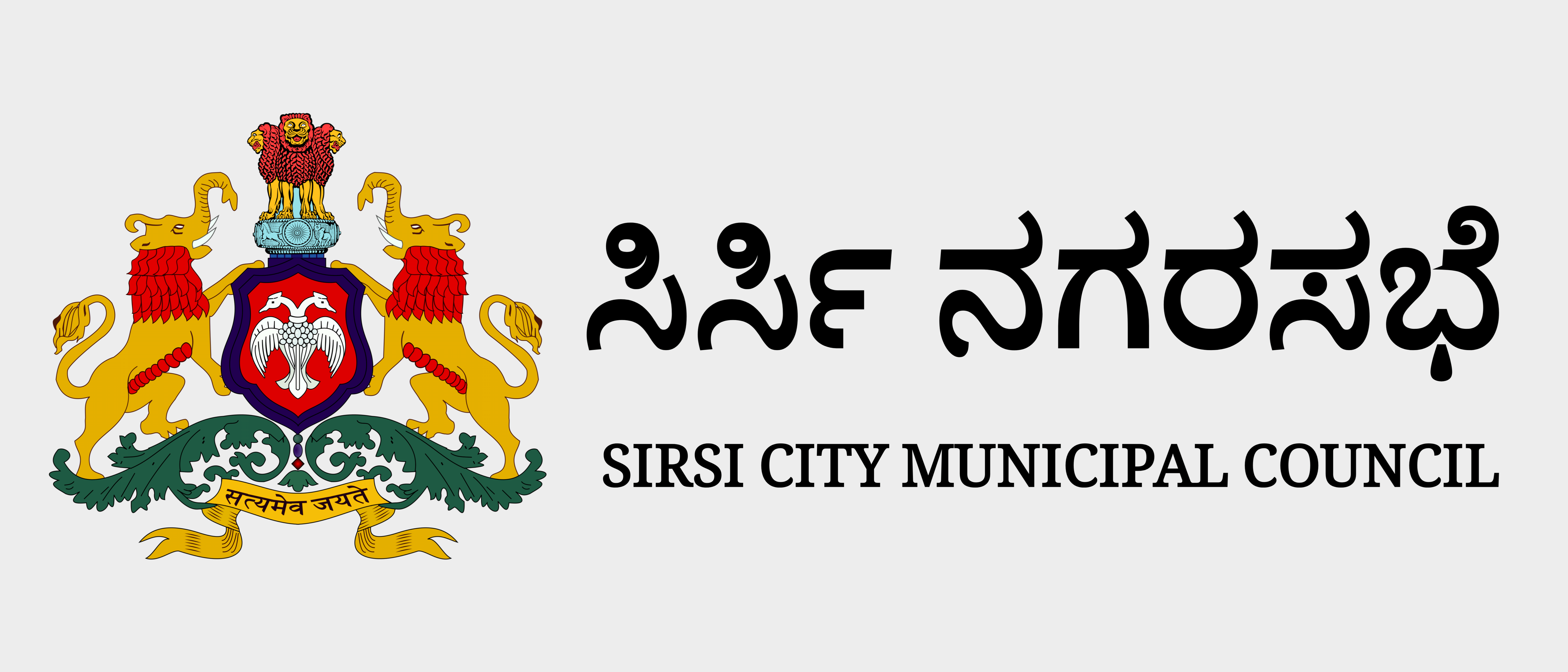

The Sirsi City Municipal Council (CMC) is the local governing body for civic administration in Sirsi. It is Established in 1866, the CMC is divided into 31 wards and is responsible for providing essential public utilities and services to the city residents, such as public health, waste management, and infrastructure maintenance. The annual budget of the Sirsi CMC for the year 2021–22 is Rs.128.28 crores, out of which Rs.781.20 lakhs was proposed for capital expenses, Rs.462.45 lakhs towards proposed revenue payment, Rs.232.09 lakhs towards extra ordinary payment, and for development of SC&ST was Rs.9.86 lakhs.

== Places of interest ==
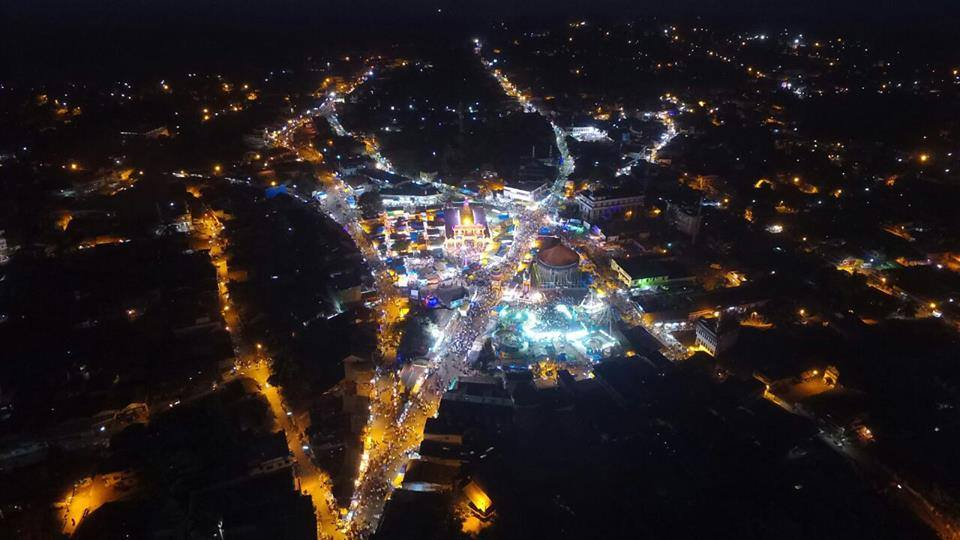
Marikamba Fair Night View

=== Banavasi Madhukeshwara Temple ===
Banavasi is the oldest town in the Karnataka state. It has grown around the Madhukeshwara Temple dedicated to Shiva, built in the 5th century. the supreme God in Shaivism, a major branch of Hinduism.

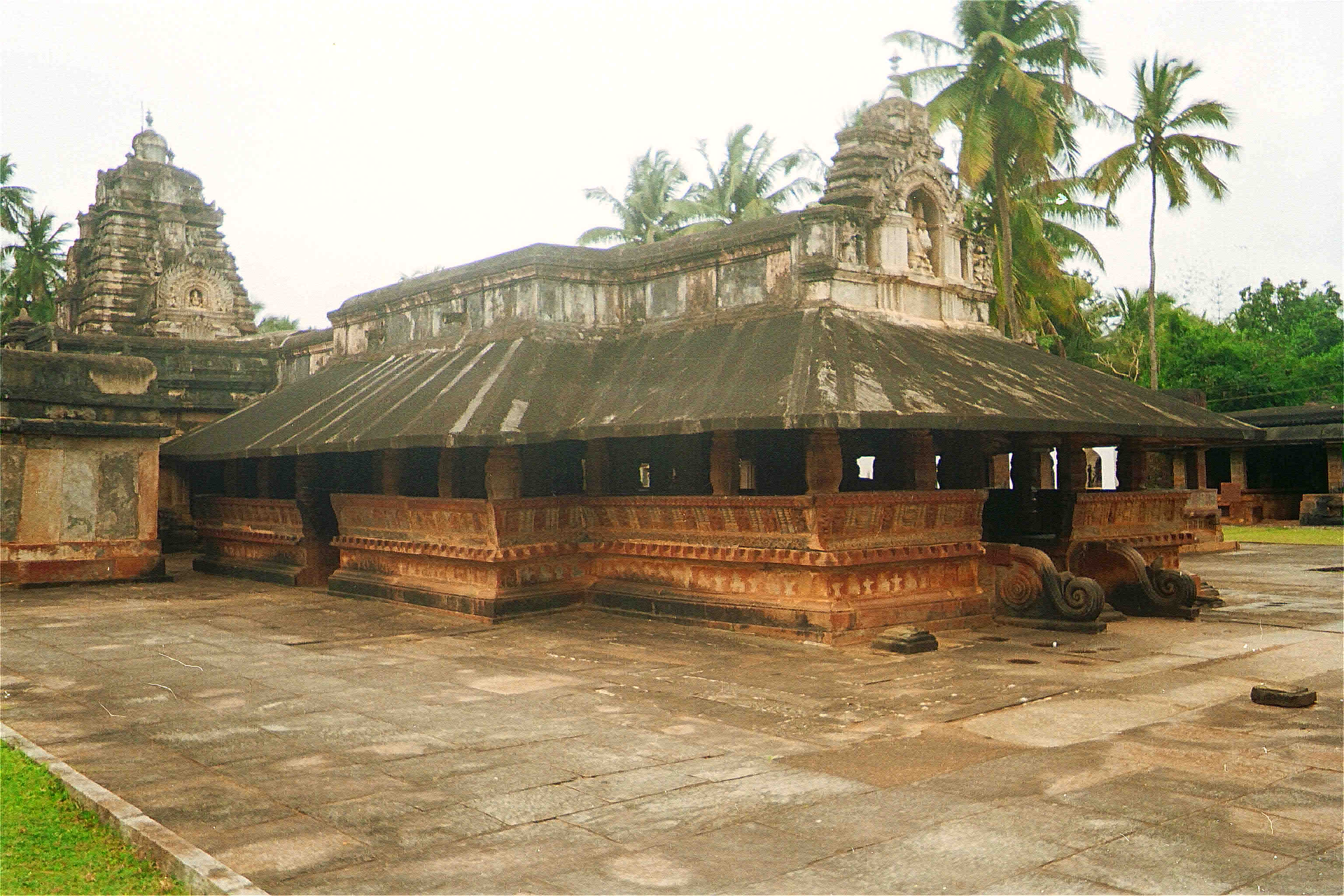
Madhukeshwara temple, Banavasi

Banavasi contains some of the oldest architectural monuments in southern India.

=== Jain Matha ===
A Jain Matha exists there, and it has been headed by Bhattaraka Swasti Sri Bhattakalanka. The Sonda Jain Matha is also known as the Swadi Jain Matha.

=== Kundapura Shri Vyasaraja Matha Hulekal ===
- Banavasi, the capital of an ancient kingdom in Karnataka (state) ruled by the Kadamba Dynasty is 24 km away from the Sirsi town center. Banavasi is considered as the "first" capital of Karnataka state, with the current capital being Bangalore. Although most of the ancient grandeur of the dynasty in Banavasi has been lost, an ancient temple for Madhukeshwara (Shiva) is still largely intact, and has been declared a monument of historical importance by the Archaeological Survey of India.
- Sahasralinga (Sanskrit for a thousand Shiva (deity) lingas) is another place of significance, where Shiva's sculptures carved out of stones thousands of years ago can be found in the middle of a flowing river. The river is surrounded by lush green forest; the place is about 10 km from the town center. The place is quite secluded, except during "Maha Shivaratri" celebrations, when it receives a huge number of pilgrims from the surrounding areas.
- Sonda, known for its Sri Vadiraja Matha, and Swarnavalli Mutt are about 15 km (9.3 mi) away from Sirsi.
- Unchalli Falls, (also known as Keppa Joga, referring to the other waterfall nearby, Jog falls) is situated about 30 km (19 mi) from Sirsi, and is one of the biggest tourist attractions near Sirsi. The waterfall is a 116-meter drop (381 ft).
- Yana, known for the unusual rock formation. It is located 40 kilometres (25 mi) from Sirsi.

=== Other destinations ===
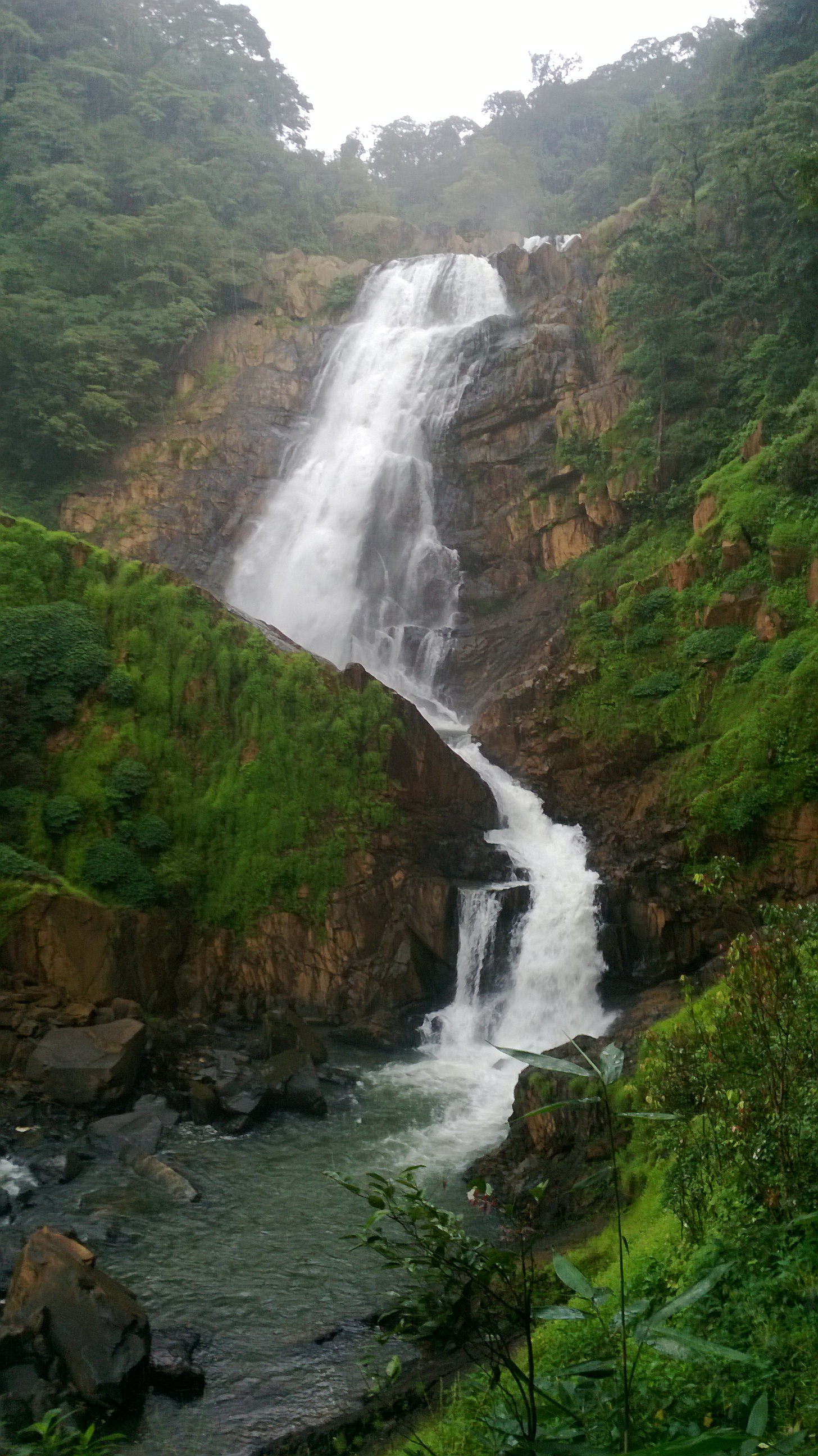
Burude Falls

- Shivaganga Falls
- Benne Hole Falls
- Halasinakatte
- Jog Falls
- Tapovan – a sacred place of Shri Vadiraja swami
- Unchalli Falls
- Vibhuthi Falls
- Sathodi Falls
- Sahasralinga
- Magod Falls

== Notable people from Sirsi ==
- Mayurasharma, Founder of Kadamba dynasty
- Adikavi Pampa, First Poet of Kannada
- Nandan Nilekani, Indian entrepreneur
- Ramakrishna Hegde, Politician, 3rd Chief Minister of Karnataka for three terms
- Vishweshwar Hegde Kageri, Politician former Speaker of the Karnataka Legislative Assembly
- Anant Kumar Hegde, Politician
- G. Devaraya Naik, Politician
