= Akheti =

- village
- Location within Karnataka Location within India
- Coordinates: 15°27′57″N 74°19′28″E
- Country: India
- State: Karnataka
- District: Uttara Kannada
- Talukas: Supa

Government
  - Body: Village Panchayat

Languages
  - Official: Kannada
- Time zone: UTC+5:30 (IST)
- Nearest city: Uttara Kannada
- Civic agency: Village Panchayat

Akheti is a village in the southern state of Karnataka, India. It is located in the Supa taluk of Uttara Kannada district in Karnataka.

== See also ==
- Uttara Kannada
- Districts of Karnataka
