= Kamala Siddi =

Indian hurdler

Kamala Babu Siddi, also known as Kamala Siddi, is a former Indian track and field athlete from Uttara Kannada, Karnataka, South India. She hails from the Siddi ethnic community, which is the only African tribe in India.

== Career ==
Her talent was spotted through the introduction of the Special Area Games Scheme, which was implemented in the 1980s to include the marginal Siddi community, who would otherwise have been generally excluded from the national sports program in India. She was part of the second batch of the Special Area Games program which was guaranteed to transform the lives of Siddi community. She clinched a gold medal in long jump in the 1991 Inter-Zonal Junior Athletics Championship held in New Delhi.

She was chosen to represent India at the 1993 South Asian Games, which were held in Dhaka, and she clinched a bronze medal in the women's 100-meter hurdles event. She also delivered continuous medal success representing India when she claimed three gold medals at the 1993 World Police Fire Games in Melbourne. She was eligible to compete at the 1993 World Police Fire Games after landing a job as a constable with Karnataka Police.

However, her dream to succeed in the field of athletics was only short-lived as the ambitious project of converting Siddi community members into Olympic athletes was scrapped, and it had a negative impact on the livelihood of the Siddi ethnic group. The Special Area Games program was abruptly scrapped in 1995 without any prior announcements and the reason for the termination of the project was not officially revealed.

She also secured day job employment opportunity with the regional railways. She currently works as the Chief Superintendent with the South Western Railway.

Kamala Siddi's daughter Nimeksha Siddi (born c. 2008) is also a sprinter who aspires to compete in the 2028 Olympic Games.
