= Joida =

- Town
- Location in Karnataka, India
- Coordinates: 15.160532°N 74.4804383°E
- Country: India
- State: Karnataka
- Region: Malenadu
- District: Uttara Kannada
- School district: Sirsi DDPI
- Nearest Large City: Hubballi

Area
  - Urban: 19.68 km^{2} (7.60 sq mi)
  - Rural: 1,881 km^{2} (726 sq mi)
- Elevation: 600 m (2,000 ft)

Population (2011)
  - Urban: 3,452
  - Rural: 52,012

Language
  - Official: Kannada
  - Dialect: Sirsi Kannada
- Time zone: UTC+5:30 (IST)
- PIN: 581 186
- Telephone code: +91-8383
- Vehicle registration: KA 65 Dandeli

Joida is a town, taluka located in the Uttara Kannada district in the Indian state of Karnataka. Earlier it was known as Supa taluka but as Supa village got submerged due to dam built across river Kali, Joida taluka came into existence.

KPCL maintains the Supa Dam, which straddles the Kali River nearby.

== Demographics ==
As of 2011 India census, Joida had a population of 3452 within town limits. Males constitute 51% of the population and females 49% (1687 males and 1765 females). Joida has an average literacy rate of 82.10%, which is much higher than the national average of 74.05% and state average 75.36%: male literacy is 90.21% and female literacy is 74.24%. In Joida population of children with age 0-6 is 401 which makes up 11.62% of total population.

Religions in Joida taluk (2011)
Religion	Percent
Hinduism	93.20%
Islam	4.09%
Christianity	2.62%
Other or not stated	0.09%
Distribution of religions

In Joida taluk, the population is 52,012, with a sex ratio of 988 females to 1000 males. The entire taluk is classified as rural.

=== Language ===
Languages of Joida taluk (2011)
1. Marathi (46.1%)
2. Konkani (33.6%)
3. Kannada (12.5%)
4. Urdu (3.54%)
5. Telugu (1.20%)
6. Hindi (1.03%)
7. Others (1.96%)

At the time of the 2011 census, 46.09% of the population spoke Marathi, 33.65% Konkani, 12.53% Kannada, 3.54% Urdu, 1.20% Telugu and 1.03% Hindi as their first language.

== Access ==
=== By train ===
The nearest railway station to Joida is Castle Rock which is located in and around 54 kilometer distance. Other nearby railway stations are Kulem railway station (30.7 km), Londa Jn railway station (44 km), Nagargali railway station (32.9 km), Devarayi railway station (34.1 km). Major railhead is Hubballi, which is the Zonal Headquarters of South Western Railways and Karwar which is 90 km far [ Konkan railways ].

=== By air ===
Joida's nearest airport is Hubli airport (90.7 km).

== Border issues ==
Uttara Kannada district was a part of Bombay Presidency during the British rule. Before reorganization of the States, the district was in Bombay State. The local Konkani-speaking people had close connections with Mumbai then. They had matrimonial relations also with the people in Bombay. Many Marathi-medium schools had also been established in Karwar and Joida taluks. Marathi films were released often in Karwar. The visit of Marathi drama troupes from Mumbai and Pune was an annual feature. However, Konkani-speaking people were disenchanted when Marathis began to claim that Konkani was a dialect of Marathi. They disputed it and asserted that Konkani had independent status as a language. It was the Konkani-speaking people led by late P.S. Kamat who argued before Mahajan Commission that Karwar was an integral part of Karnataka, which is upheld by the historical context too.

== See also ==
- Karwar
- Mangalore
- Belgaum
