= Demographics of Karnataka =

Karnataka, with a total population of 61,100,000, is one of the major states in South India. Kannada is the official state language, while other linguistic minorities in the state include Kodava, Konkani, Tulu and Urdu. Karnataka is also at the forefront of population control measures, with the first two birth control clinics in history opening in 1930 in the Mandya district.

== Population ==
At the time of the 2011 Census of India, the total population in Karnataka was 6.25 crores (a crore equates to 10 million), with 50.9% being males and 49.1% females. There was a decadal population increase of 17.3% between 1991 and 2001. As per the 2011 census, the population density is 319 per km², the sex ratio is 973 females to 1,000 males, and 38.67% of the people in Karnataka live in urban areas.

The literacy rate in Karnataka was 75.4% at the time of the 2001 census; the eight most-populous cities of the state, in-order from highest to lowest total population, were Bengaluru, Hubballi-Dharwad, Mysuru, Belagavi, Kalburgi, Mangaluru, Davanagere and Ballari. Bengaluru Urban and Belagavi are the most populous Districts, each of them having a population of more than three million. Gadaga, Chamarajanagara and Kodagu districts have a population of less than one million. Karnataka has one of the largest populations of Anglo-Indians in India. Seen below is a composite table of languages and religions of the state at the census of 2001.

=== Religion ===
Religion in Karnataka
Hindu	84.00%
Muslim	13.00%
Christian	1.80%
Others	1.20%

At the time of the 2011 Census of India, 84.0% of the population were Hindu, 13.00% Muslim, 1.80% Christian, 0.7% Jain, 0.2% Buddhist, <0.1% Sikhs, with the remaining percentage belonging to other religions. Karnataka is also the location of some tribes, such as the Nayaka, Soliga, and Yerava. The joint family system is prevalent in the rural areas of Karnataka; there are extreme cases, like the Narasinganavars, who reside in the Dharwad district, and are recognised as one of the largest undivided families in the world.

Religion in Karnataka
Religion	2001		2011	
Religion	Population	(%)	Population	(%)
Hinduism	44,321,279	83.86	51,317,472	84.00
Islam	6,463,127	12.23	7,893,065	12.92
Christianity	1,009,164	1.91	1,142,647	1.87
Jainism	412,659	0.78	440,280	0.72
Buddhism	393,300	0.74	95,710	0.16
Sikhism	15,326	0.03	28,773	0.05
Other	115,460	0.22	11,263	0.02
Not stated	—N/a	—N/a	166,087	0.27
Total	52,850,562		61,095,297	

=== Caste and Communities ===
Just like other Ethnolinguistic groups in India, Kannada speaking people also form a number of distinct communities. The two single biggest communities numerically are the Lingayat and the Vokkaliga from North and South Karnataka respectively, while Scheduled Castes make up the largest cohesive group of communities. There are also numerous OBC (other backward communities) including the former pastoralist community of Kuruba, Scheduled Tribes like the Boya/Valmiki, scheduled castes like Banjara and Adi Karnataka. Kannada Brahmins are divided into several communities. Although historically Jainism in Karnataka had dominant presence, Kannada Jains today form a small minority.

In Karnataka, Only 4 communities — Brahmin, Jain, Aryavaishya, Nagarthas — are outside the existing reservation matrix.

There are approximately 42 lakhs Brahmin (nearly 7% of population) and majority are concentrated in Bengaluru (approximately 15 lakhs). The Brahmins of Karnataka are Smarta, Madhva and Sri Vaishnavites. There are Saraswat Brahmin concentration in Coastal Karnataka.

=== Languages ===
Government Census On Language
Language	2001( %)	2011( %)
Kannada	68.5	66.46
Hindi	0.6%	1.43
Urdu	10.5	10.83
Telugu	5.00	5.84
Tamil	3.2	3.45
Tulu	2.1	2.61
Marathi	3.40	3.80
Lambadi		1.59
Malayalam	0.13	1.22
Beary	1.3	
Konkani	1.0	1.29
Others	2.71	1.99

== Districts ==

Population of districts of Karnataka as per 2001 census
District	Population	Decadal %age growth 1991 -> 2001
Bangalore Urban	6,537,124	34.8
Bangalore Rural	1,881,514	12.2
Chitradurga	1,517,896	15.1
Davanagere	1,790,952	14.8
Kolar	2,536,069	13.8
Shimoga	1,642,545	12.9
Tumkur	2,584,711	11.9
Bagalkot	1,651,892	18.8
Belgaum	4,214,505	17.4
Bijapur	1,806,918	17.6
Dharwad	1,604,253	16.7
Gadag	971,835	13.1
Haveri	1,439,116	13.3
Uttara Kannada	1,353,644	10.9
Bellary	2,027,140	22.3
Bidar	1,502,373	19.6
Gulbarga	3,130,922	21.0
Koppal	1,196,089	24.6
Raichur	1,669,762	21.9
Chamarajanagar	965,462	9.2
Chikmagalur	1,140,905	12.0
Dakshina Kannada	1,897,730	14.5
Hassan	1,721,669	9.7
Kodagu	548,561	11.6
Mandya	1,763,705	7.1
Mysore	2,641,027	15.0
Udupi	1,112,243	6.9

== See also ==
- Karnataka ethnic groups
- Kannada people

== Footnotes ==
Official Census Portal of Mysore District
