= Arga =

Arga may refer to:

- Arga (river), in northern Spain
  - Arga metropolitan park (Mancomunidad de la Comarca de Pamplona)
- Arga, Karnataka, a village in Uttara Kannada District, Karnataka, India
  - Arga Beach
- Arga-Tas, a mountain range in Yakutia, Russia
- Arga-Sala, a river in Yakutia, Russia
- Arga-Yuryakh, a river in Yakutia, Russia (Omoloy basin)
- Arga-Yuryakh (Rassokha), a river in Yakutia, Russia (Alazeya basin)
- Arga, an alternative name for Akçadağ, Turkey
