= Shivganga Falls =

Waterfall in India

The Shivaganga Falls is a 74 m high waterfall on the river Shalmala in Uttara Kannada, India. This is about 35 km away from the town of Sirsi. The waterfall is located in an area of thick forest.

== See also ==
- List of waterfalls
- List of waterfalls in India
