= Belke, Karnataka =

Village in Karnataka, India

Coordinates: 13°57′24″N 74°34′48″E

Belke or Belake is a village and gram panchayat in Bhatkal taluk, Uttara Kannada district in Karnataka, India, located near the mouth of the Chowtani river.

In 2011 it had a population of 4,891.

Belke includes the sub-village of Bedrakeri, which is the location of the GLPS Bedrakeri. It is a small village of approximately 150 people near the Arabian Sea. The NH-66 Mangalore to Karwar national highway and Konkan railway cross the village.
