= M. M. Jalisatgi =

Indian politician (1912–?)

M. M. Jalisatgi (born 8 October 1912 — ?) was an Indian politician.

Jalisatgi was born in Honnavar, North Kanara District. He passed the Advocate's examination and was a practicing Pleader at Honnavar. He was also an agriculturist. M.M. Jalisatgi joined the civil disobedience movement in 1940, worked in the Satyagraha camp, and started voluntary schools during the period 1939 to 1942. He was a detenu for a period of 8 months from December 1942 to August 1943. He was president of the District Congress of Ryots Sangha for three years, and was a promoter of the Honavar Taluk agricultural produce market Committee. He acted as Director of the North Kanara District Co-operative Bank; One of the sponsors of Malnad progressive Education Society, Honnavar; Member of the Town Municipal Council for 25 years; was president for one term; left Congress in April 1966 and joined P.S.P. Elected in the fourth general elections from Bhatkal Constituency.
