= Chittani Ramachandra Hegde =

Indian artist

- ಚಿಟ್ಟಾಣಿ ರಾಮಚಂದ್ರ ಹೆಗಡೆ
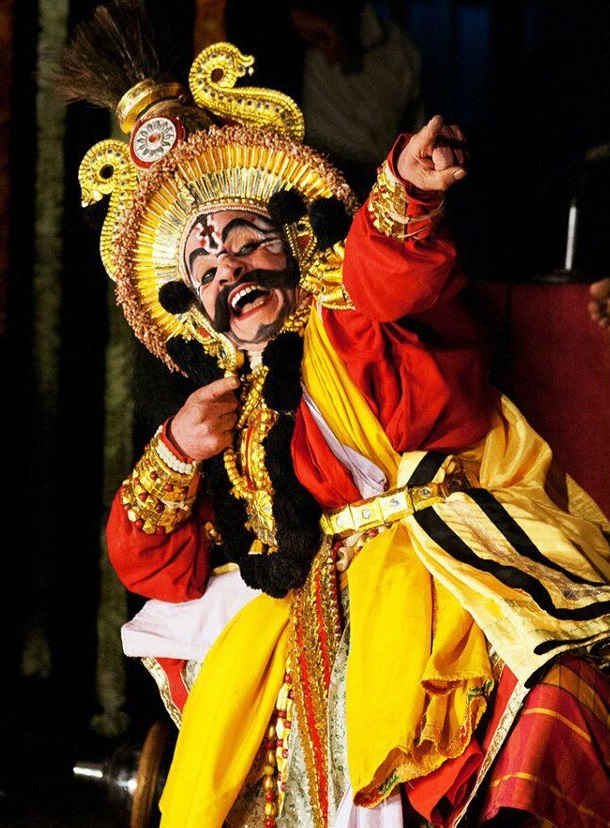
- Chittani Ramachandra Hegde
- Born: 18 September 1933; Honnavara, Uttara Kannada, Karnataka, India
- Died: 3 October 2017 (aged 84); Manipal, India
- Honours: Padma Shri Award

Chittani Ramachandra Hegde (1 January 1933 – 3 October 2017) was a Yakshagana artist from Honnavara, Uttara Kannada, Karnataka. He was the first Yakshagana artist to be awarded the Padma Shri Award by the Government of India.

== About ==
Chittani Ramachandra Hegde is the first Yakshagana artist to win the prestigious Padmashri award before winning several awards in Karnataka. His style is so popular that it is called Chittani Gharana. He started his Yakshagana career when he was just 7 years old, after dropping out of School when he was still studying in II Standard. He started performing in main roles when he was just 14 years old and performed on stage until a few days preceding his death in October 2017. He hailed from Uttara Kannada district and is popularly known as Chittani among his huge fan base.

== Life ==
Chittani Ramachandra Hegde was born in the Uttara Kannada district of Karnataka. He practised badaguthittu style of Yakshagana. In spite of stiff resistance from family members, he started giving Yakshagana performances at the age of 15 and continued to act till age 83, a few days before his death.

== Yakshagana performances ==
Chittani due to his skillful Yakshagana is considered as "the finest example of what one could achieve in life with hard work and achievements". Chittani performed Yakshagana all over India and abroad. His experience on stage has enabled him to master even the various characters of the art. He even earned praise and appreciation from the late Dr Rajkumar.

== Chittani and Yakshagana ==
Chittani Ramachandra Hegde is one of the few names that Badaguthittu brings to mind. The Badagu style of Yakshagana is the coming together of dialogue, dance and acting. When all the three aspects are in the right proportion, the character that is portrayed comes out as required. This style of Yakshagana provides a great scope for the growth of the character portrayed. In fact Yakshagana is one art that provides a huge canvas for the characters to come to life. Probably no other art form offers that scope. As a result, the growth of the artiste means the growth of the character and hence the growth of the art itself.

Chittani was an artist of very high calibre, having dedicated more than six decades to Yakshagana. Even in old age, not a day was complete until Chittani tied anklets to his feet for the dance. Chittani was also known for his generous and encouraging attitude especially towards his fellow artists.

Chittani grew up to the sounds of the Chande and Maddale. Yakshagana is very active through the year in North and South Canara and Shimoga district. Chittani, influenced by this environment since childhood, gave up his studies after class two and ever since has devoted all his time towards learning and perfecting the art of Yakshagana. Having learnt the intricacies of the art from a number of troupes and artistes like Shivarama Hegde and Kondadakuli Rama Hegde, Chittani soon rose to the level of playing the lead roles. Whichever troupe that Chittani became part of, had nothing to worry about as all the shows ran to packed houses whenever Chittani performed. It would not amount to exaggeration if one were to say that Chittani was the only 'box office hero' in the history of Yakshagana.

According to his fans, some of the characters portrayed by Chittani have actually been created by him. Bhasmasura-Mohini's Bhasmasura, Gadhayudda's Kaurava, Sudhanvarjuna's Arjuna as well as Sudhanva, Keechaka, Jarasandha, Karthaveeryarjuna, Dushtabuddhi, Maghagada, kamsa, kaladara, Rudrakopa among others, are characters which he mastered. He has grown with the characters he portrayed and the characters too have grown with him. Chittani was more of an entertaining artist.

With his performances, he drew a fan following which included Kannada stars like Dr.Raj Kumar, Uday Kumar and Sreenath. Uday Kumar, who was known for his negative roles, would attend 'all-night' Yakshagana performances at the Town Hall in Bengaluru to study Chittani's expressions. Some of the expressions enacted by Yakshagana artists are known after Chittani.

Mantapa Prabhakara Upadhya, Yakshagana artiste, described Chittani as a man who had taught him humility and the need to respect even the person who bought the cheapest ticket for a show. "He once told me that one should put on banna (make-up) as if it was one's last performance. That is the highest philosophy I have learnt from Chittani", said Upadhya.

Chittani's portrayal of the character Bhasmasura was widely regarded by audiences as exceptional. His primary artistic strengths lay in his dancing and acting abilities, with his expressive depictions of anger, shringara, and fear establishing him as a prominent figure in the art form. His two sons, Subramanya Chittani and Narasimha Chittani, have followed in their father's footsteps and are actively pursuing the craft.

=== First Padmashri award for Yakshagana ===
Chittani Ramachandra Hegde is the first artist performing Yakshagana, to receive prestigious Padmashri award and he dedicated the award to "Yakshagana".

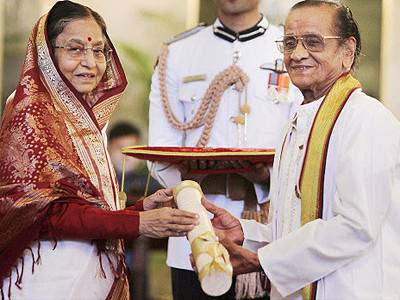
President Pratibha Patil presents Padma Shri to Ramachandra Subraya Hegde Chittani at Padma Awards ceremony at the Rashtrapati Bhavan in New-Delhi (2012)

== Gallery ==
Chittani Ramachandra Hegde Photos

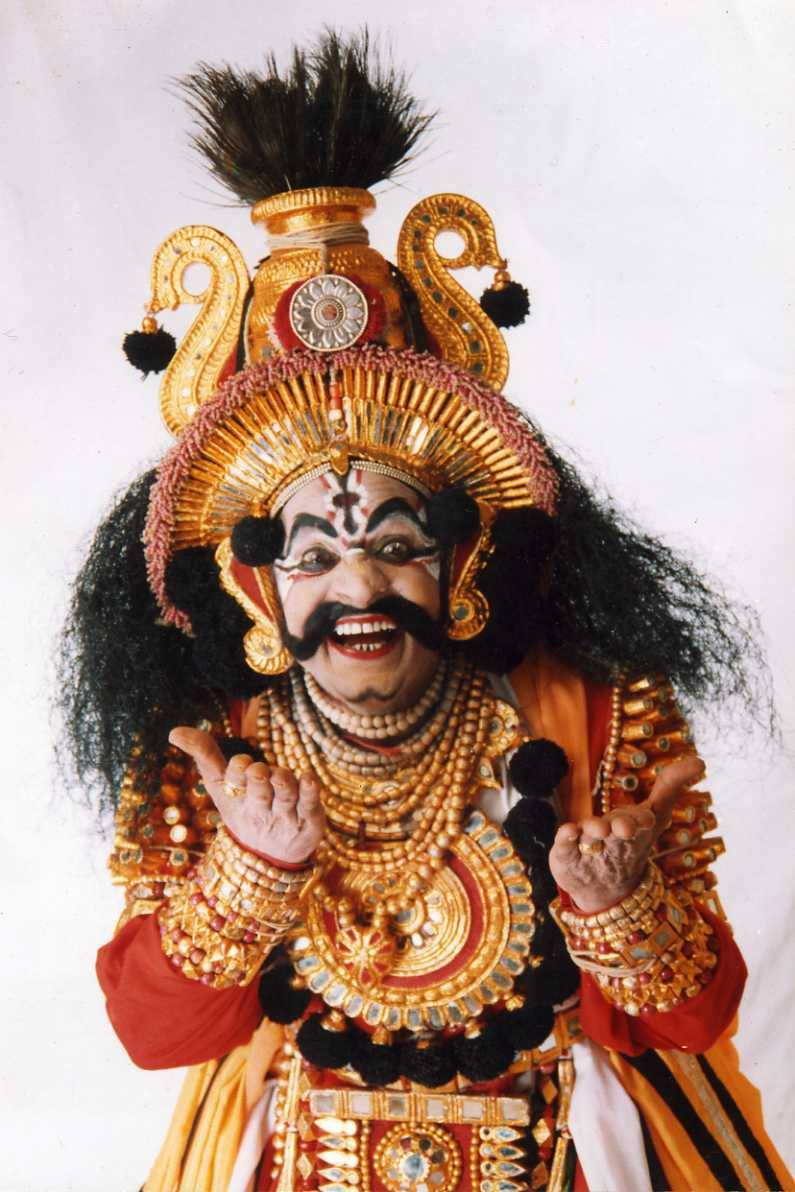

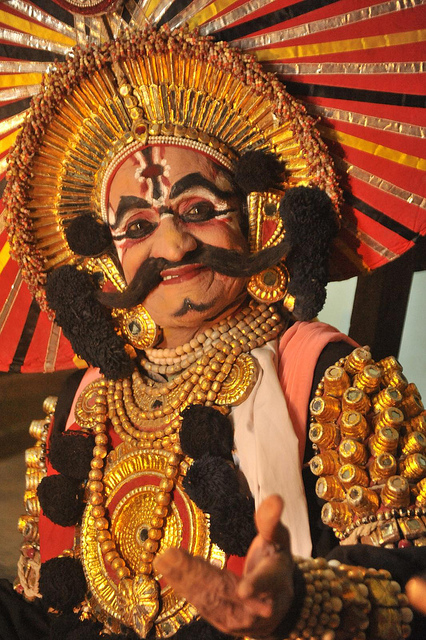

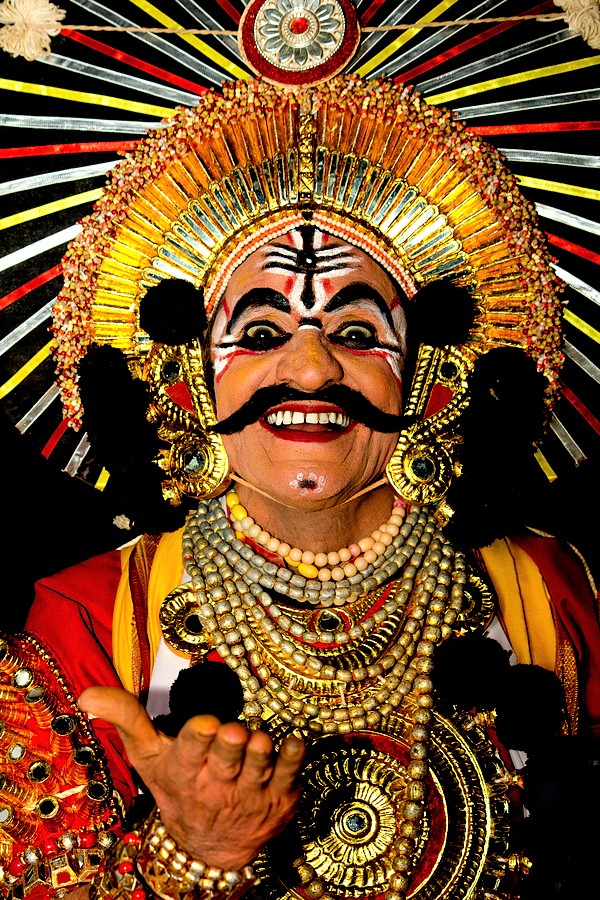
Shri.Chittani Ramachandra Hegde as Sudhanva

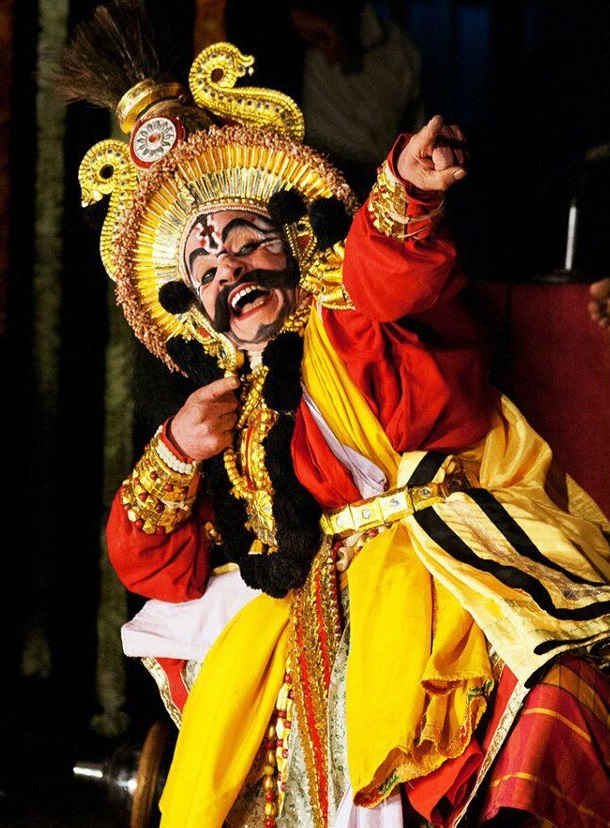
Shri.Chittani Hegde as kaurava (Padya-Ninneye balu yenu) -Yakshagana

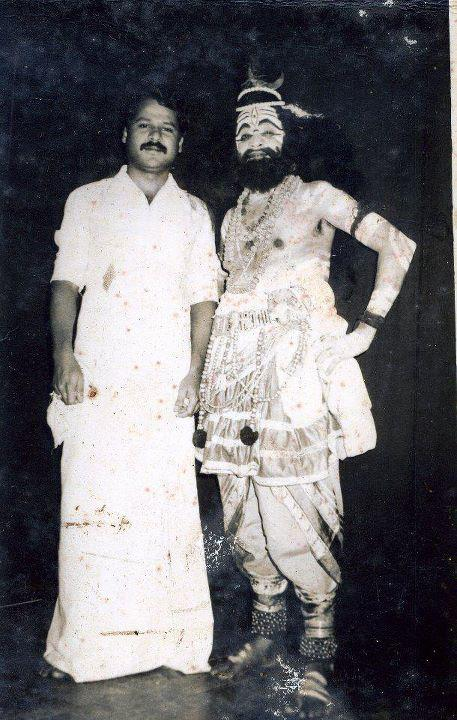
Shri.Chittani Ramachandra Hegde with bhagwat-Shri. G.R.Kalinga navuda

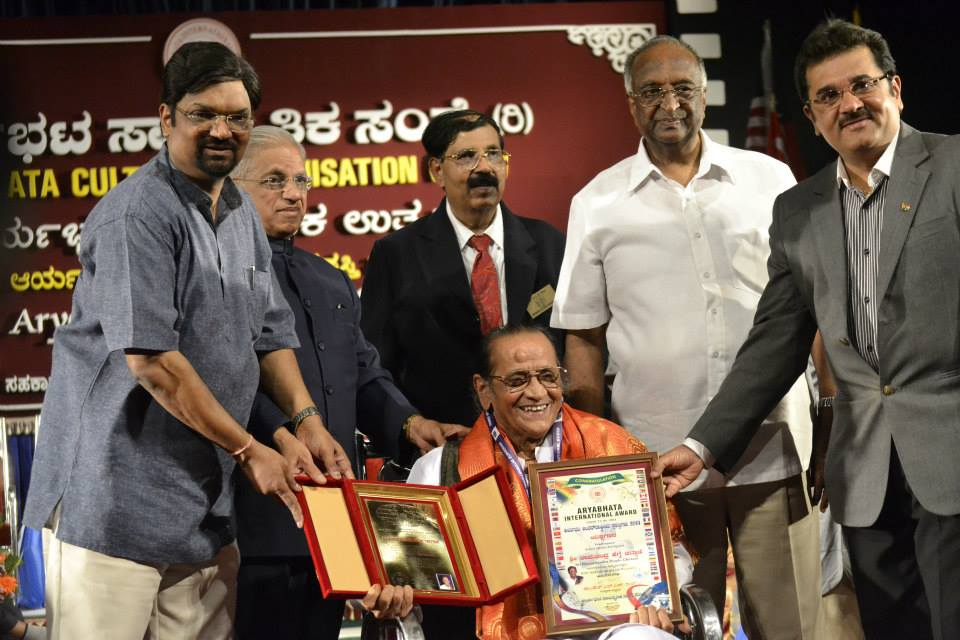
Shri.Chittani Hegde receiving Aryabhata International award by Aryabhata cultural Organization for immense contribution in field of Yakshagana

== Death ==
Chittani Ramachandra Hegde fell ill with pneumonia on 29 September 2017, and died on 3 October 2017 at Manipal Hospital.

== Awards ==
- Padma Shri award in 2012, by Ministry of Home affairs, Government of India.
- K. Shivaram Karanth award in 2009, by Kotathattu grama panchayat, Karnataka.
- Janapadashri Award in 2004.
- Keremane Shivarama Hegde Award in 2013.
- Rajyotsava Prashasti award in 1991.
- Karki Venkataramana Shastri Suri Award in 2009
- Aryabhata International Award for immense contribution in field of Yakshagana
- Alva's Nudisiri Award in 2012
- Astana kalavida Prashasti in 2009 from Udupi Krishna Matt

== Admirers ==
Week long Yakshagana performances in his name, styled "Chittani Yaksha Sambhrama" are conducted by his admirers at Mangalore every year.
