= Uttara Kannada =

District of Karnataka, India

- District
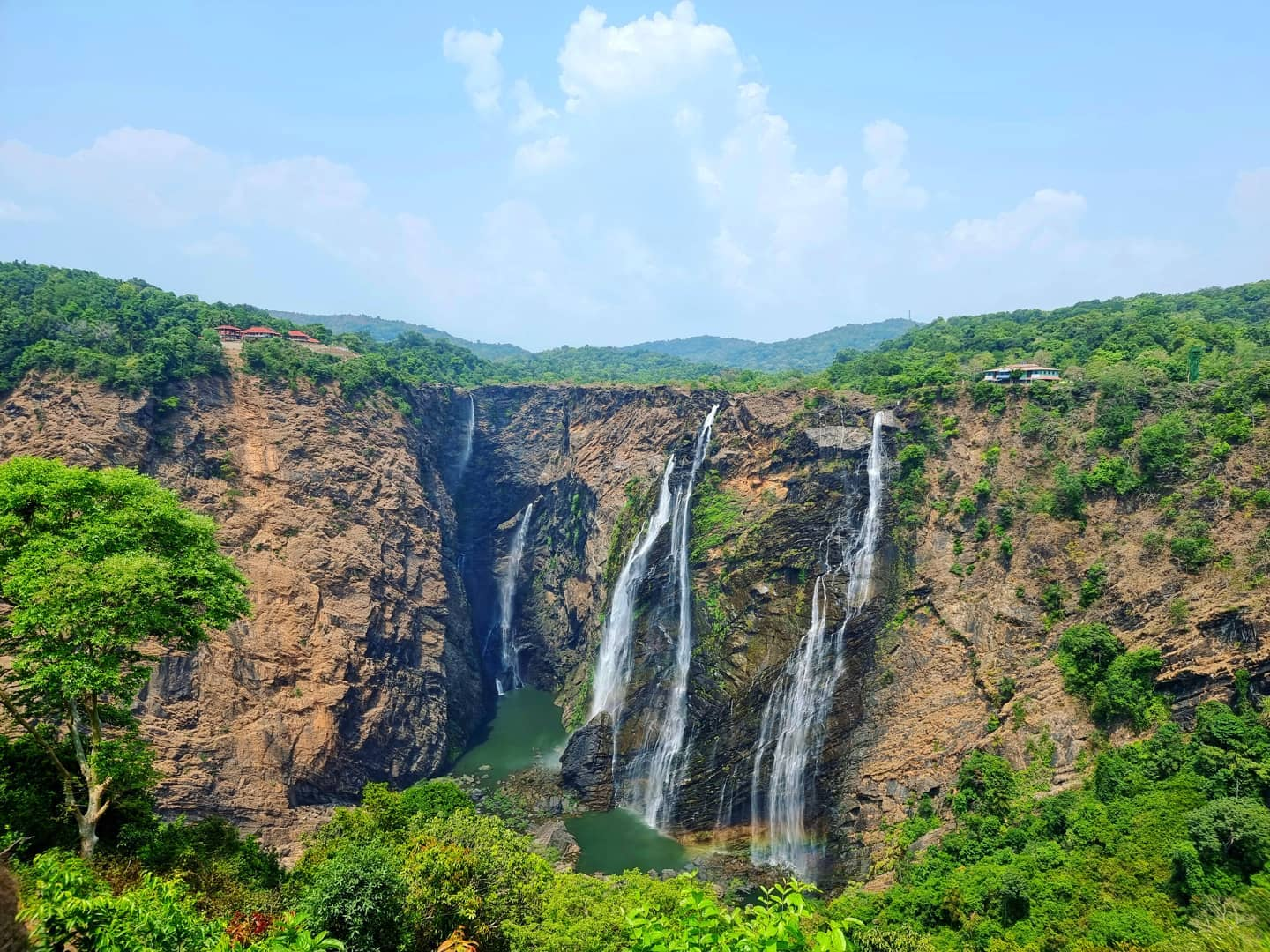
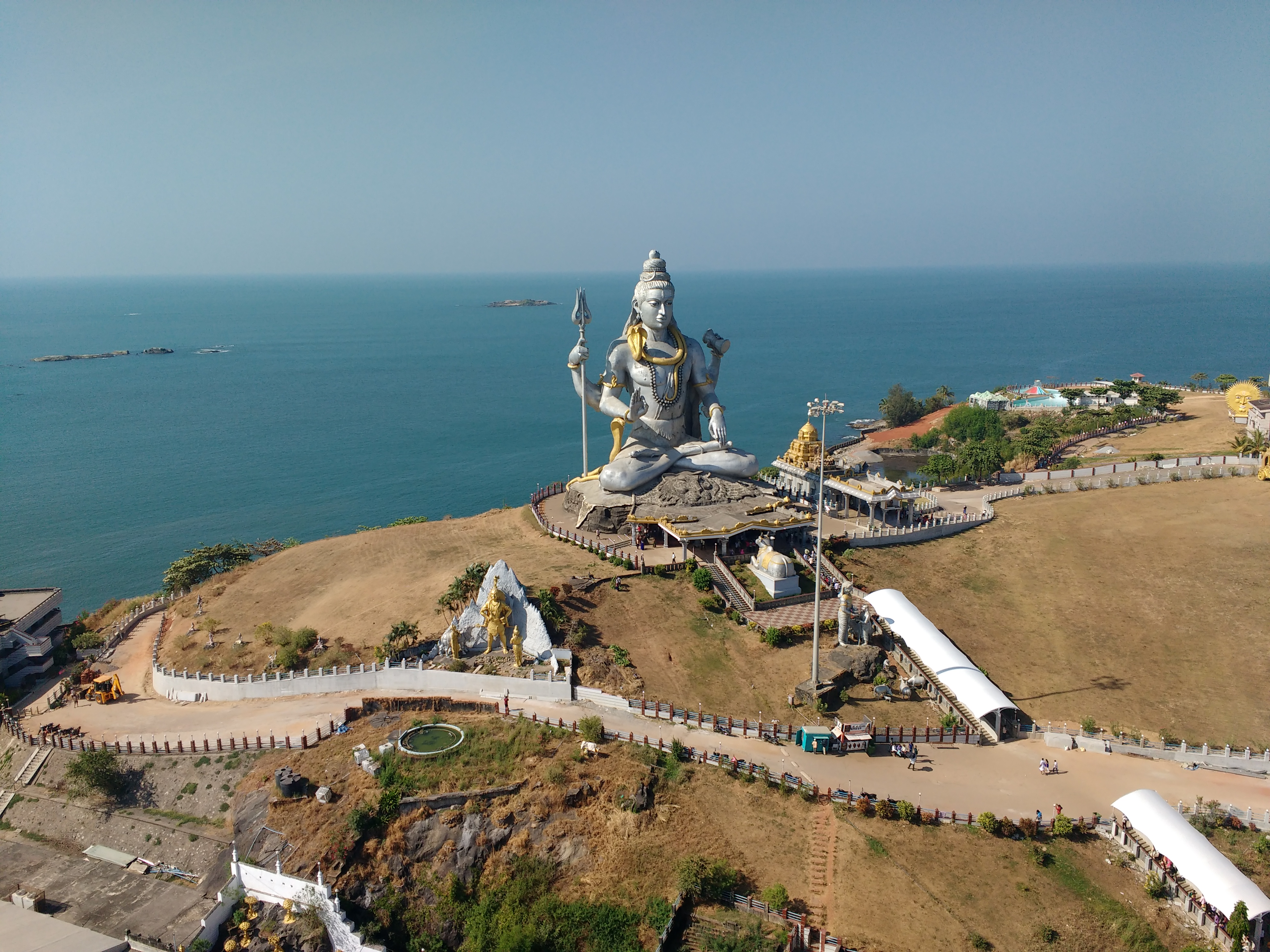
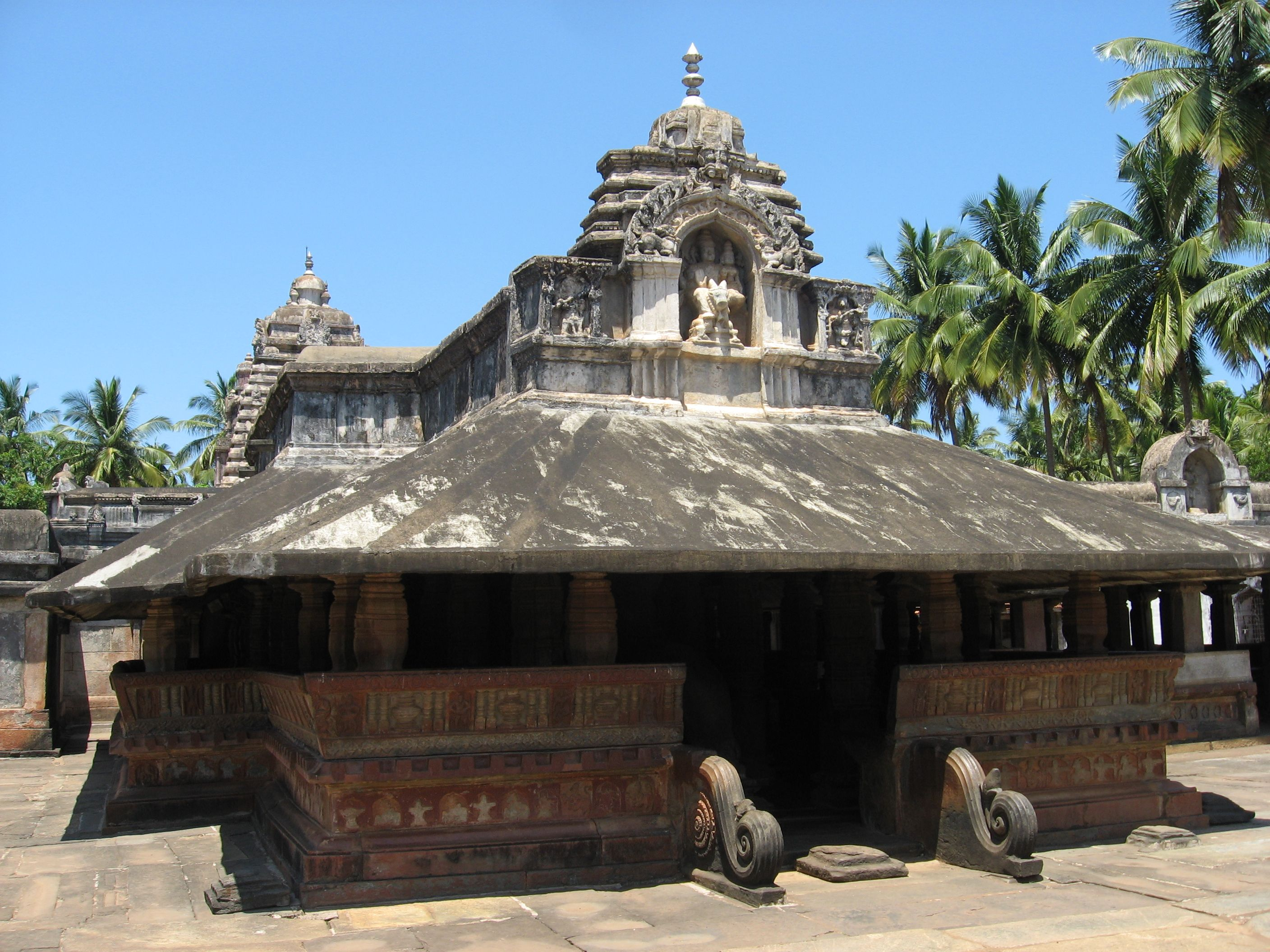
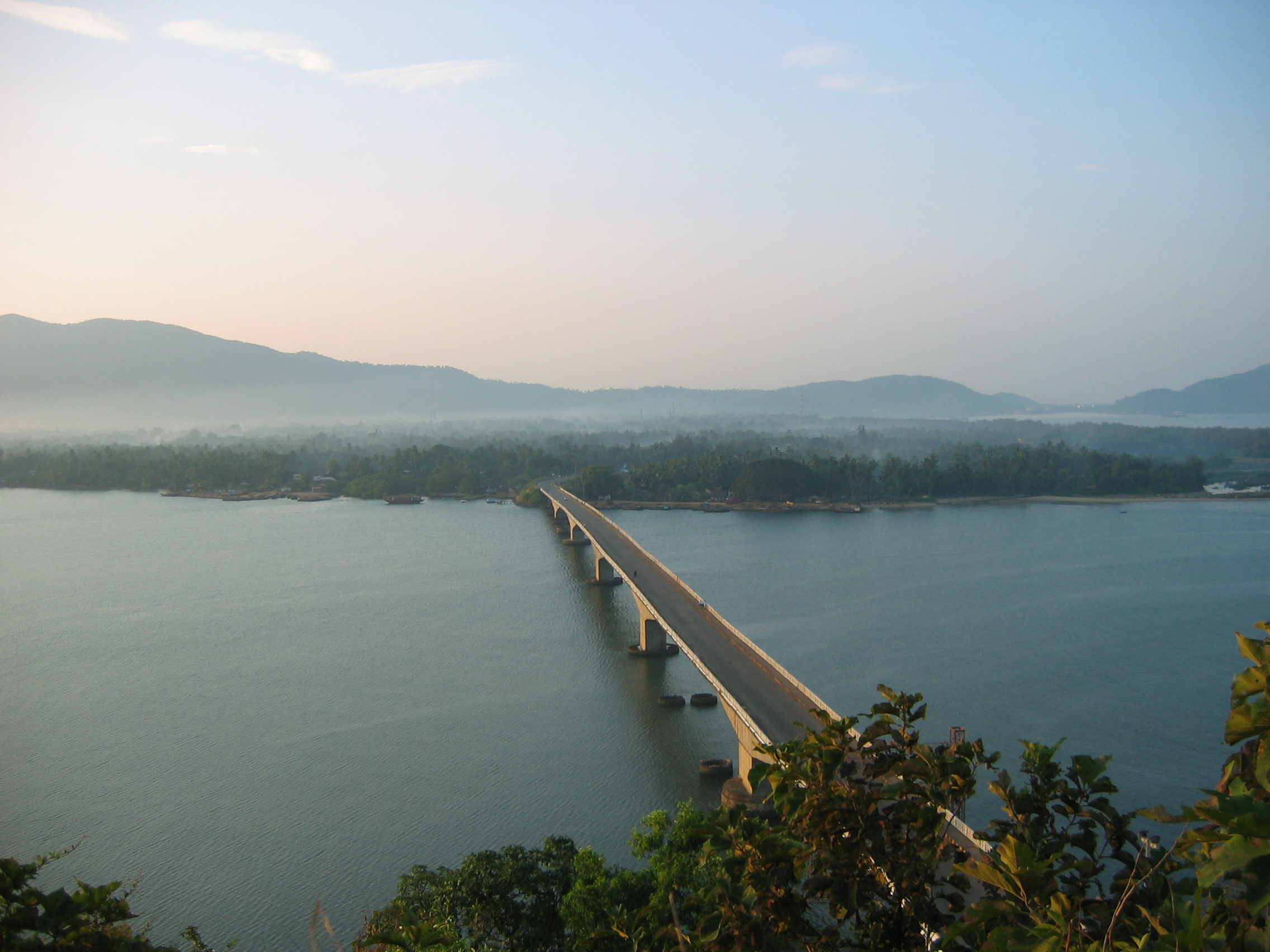
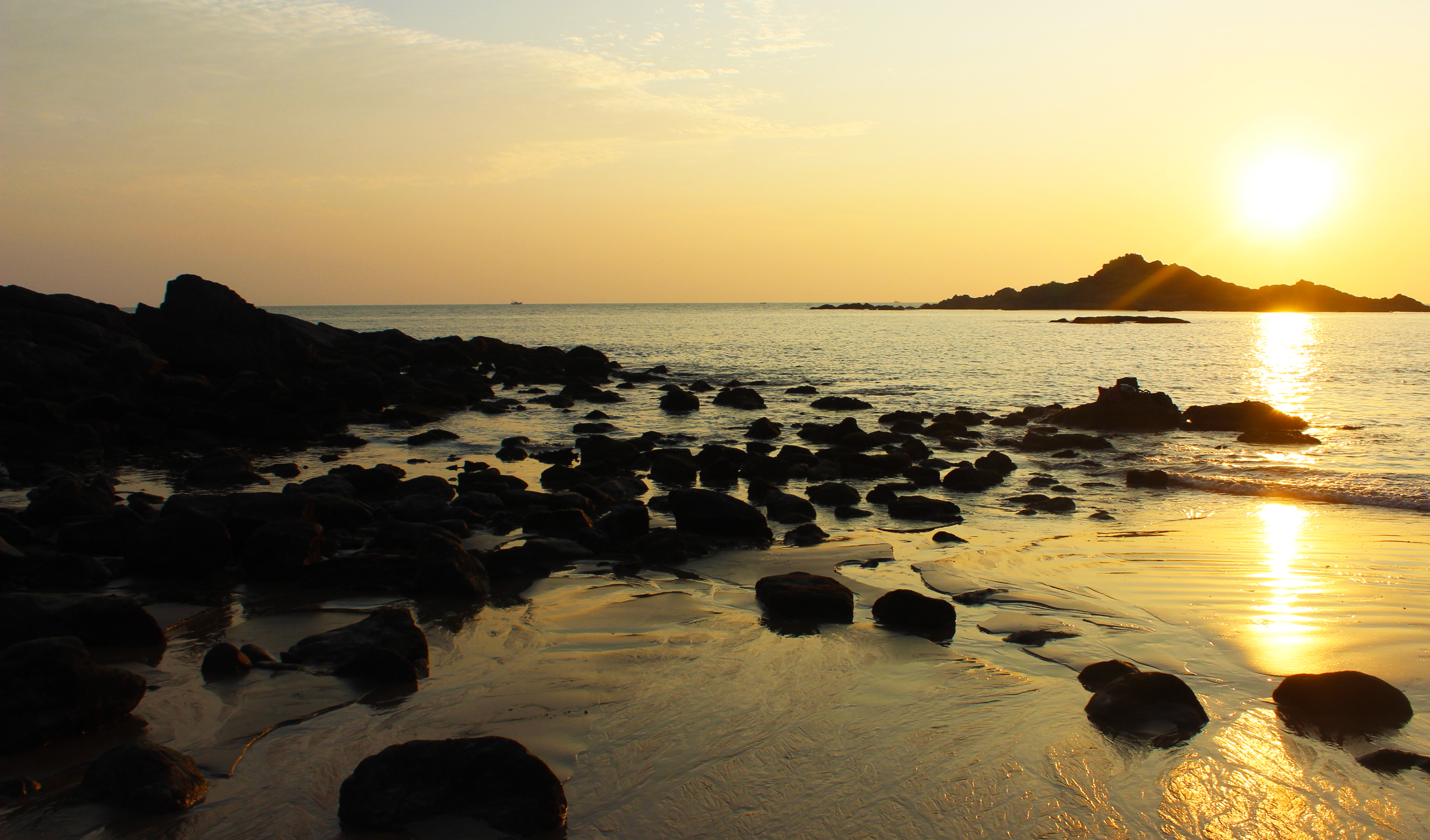
- Clockwise from top-left: Jog Falls, Murudeshwar Temple, Kali River Bridge at Karwar, Om Beach at Gokarna, Madhukesvara Temple at Banavasi
- Nickname: Kashmir of Karnataka
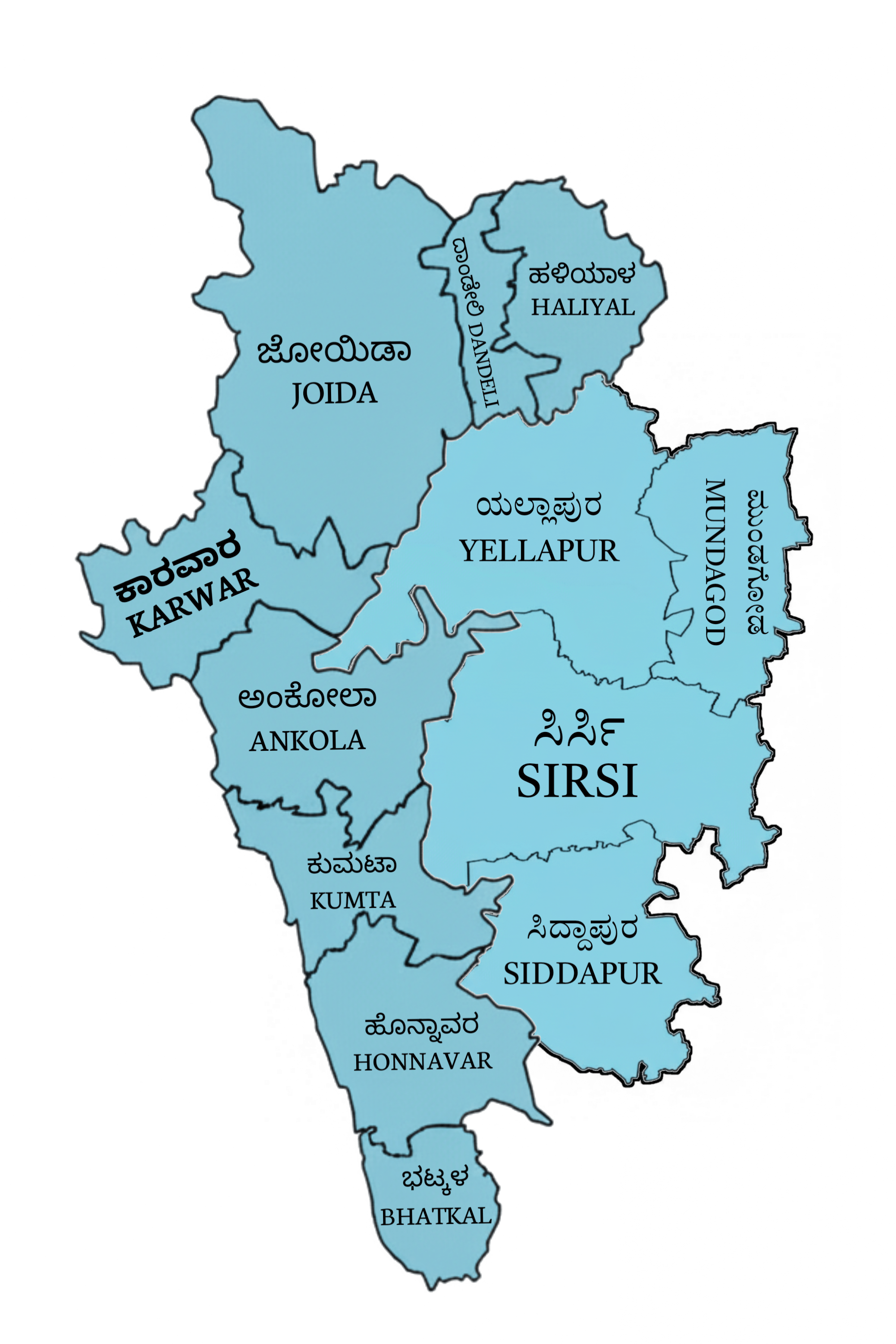
- Coordinates: 14.6°N 74.7°E
- Country: India
- State: Karnataka
- Established: 1 November 1956
- Talukas: Karwar; Ankola; Kumta; Honnavar; Bhatkal; Sirsi; Siddapur; Yellapur; Mundgod; Haliyal; Joida; Dandeli

Government
  - District Minister: Mankal S Vaidya
  - MP: Vishweshwar Hegde Kageri
  - DC: Lakshmi Priya. K, I.A.S

Area
  - Total: 10,291 km^{2} (3,973 sq mi)
  - Rank: 5th
- Elevation Average: 600 m (2,000 ft)

Population (2011)
  - Total: 1,437,169
  - Rank: 20th
  - Density: 140/km^{2} (360/sq mi)

Languages
  - Official: Kannada
- Time zone: UTC+5:30 (IST)
- PIN: 581xxx
- Telephone code: +91 0(838x)
- ISO 3166 code: IN-KA
- Vehicle registration: Karwar KA 30; Sirsi KA 31; Honnavar KA 47; Dandeli KA 65
- Coastline: 142 kilometres (88 mi)
- Literacy: 84.06%
- Lok Sabha constituency: Uttara Kannada
- Climate: Monsoon (Köppen)
- Precipitation: 2,835 millimetres (111.6 in)
- Avg. summer temperature: 33 °C (91 °F)
- Avg. winter temperature: 20 °C (68 °F)
- Website: uttarakannada.nic.in

Uttara Kannada is the fifth largest district in the Indian state of Karnataka. It is bordered by the state of Goa and Belagavi districts to the north, Dharwad and Haveri Districts to the east, Shivamogga and Udupi Districts to the south, and the Laccadive Sea to the west. Karwar is the district headquarters while Sirsi is the major commercial center in the district. The district's agroclimatic divisions include the coastal plain which consists of Karwar, Ankola, Kumta, Honnavar, the Bhatkal taluks and Malenadu, consisting of Sirsi, Siddapur, Yellapur, Haliyal, Dandeli, Joida and the Mundgod taluks.

== History ==
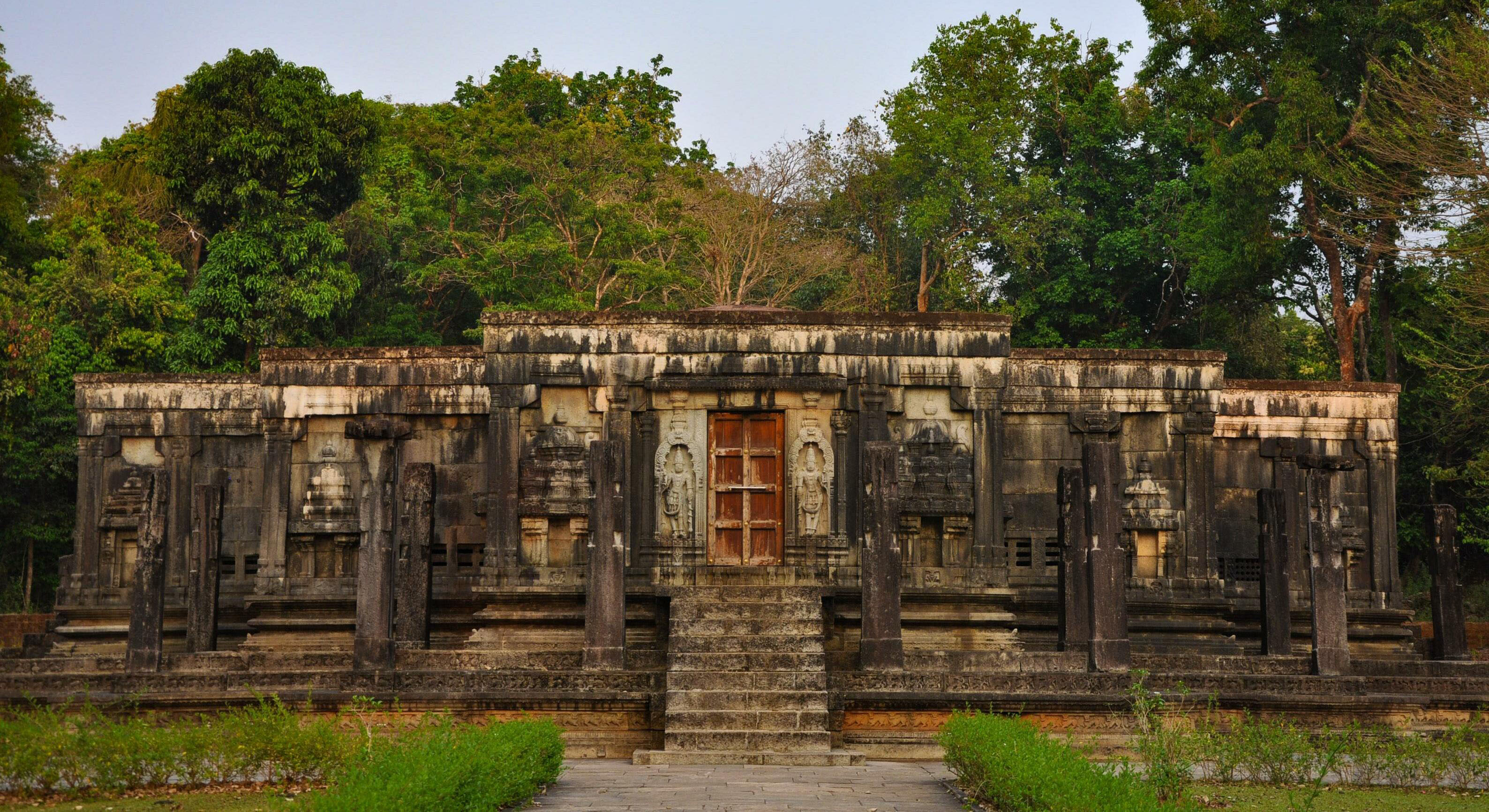
Chaturmukha Basadi, Gerusoppa constructed by Rani Chennabhairadevi, considered to be longest reigning Pepper queen.

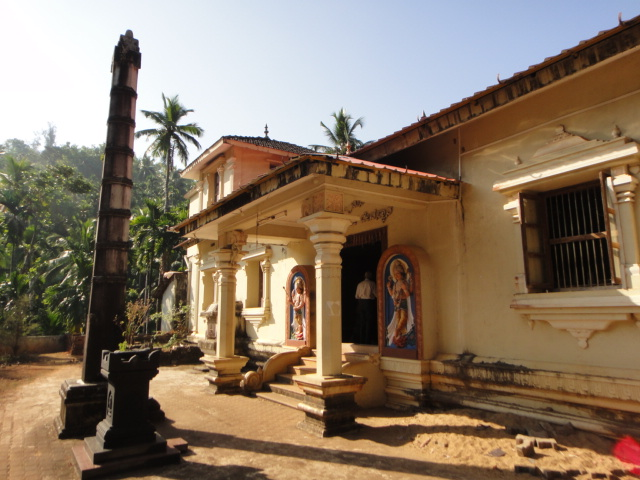
Kodlamane Shree Vishnumurthy Temple

Kali River & Sadashivgad Fort as seen from Nandangadda Village.

The first known dynasty from Uttara Kannada District are Chutus of Banavasi. Uttara Kannada was the home of the Kadamba kingdom from the 350 to 525. They ruled from Banavasi. After the subjugation of the Kadambas by the Chalukyas, the district came under successive rule of empires like Chalukyas, Rashtrakutas, Hoysalas and Vijayanagar empire. Moroccan traveler Ibn Battuta is said to have stayed for a time in the district under the protection of Nawayath Sultan Jamal Al-Din at Hunnur. This place is presently known as Hosapatna and is located in the town of Honnavar. Ruins of an old mosque and its minaret can still be seen in the village. The district came under the rule of Maratha Empire in the 1750s and later part of Mysore Kingdom, who ceded it to the British at the conclusion of the Fourth Mysore War in 1799. It was initially part of Kanara district in Madras Presidency. The district was divided into North and South Kanara districts in 1859. The British finally transferred Uttara Kannada district to the Bombay Presidency in 1862.

After India's independence in 1947, Bombay Presidency was reconstituted as Bombay State. In 1956, the southern portion of Bombay State was added to Mysore State, which was renamed Karnataka in 1973.

Significant and picturesque, the Sadashivgad fort of historical importance is now a tourist destination located by the Kali river bridge, which has been built at the confluence of the river and the Arabian Sea. The renowned Bengali poet and Nobel laureate Rabindranath Tagore, who visited Uttara Kannada in 1882, dedicated an entire chapter of his memoirs to this town. The 22-year-old Rabindranath Tagore stayed with his brother, Satyendranath Tagore, who was the district judge in Uttara Kannada. There is a substantial amount of Chardo families in this area as they had migrated due to the persecution of the Portuguese in Goa.

=== Portuguese ===
Cintacora, also known as Chittakula, and Sindpur, were Portuguese and Chittakula was known to them as a very old port. When the fort of Sadashivgad was built in this area, the village also came to be known by that name. Pir fort, named for the Dargah of Shah Karamuddin, was captured and burnt by the Portuguese in 1510. The creek at the mouth of the Kali River was a trading center which came into great prominence after Sadashivgad was built and the Portuguese realized the advantages of its sheltered harbour.

=== British ===
In 1638, a rival English trading body, the Courteen Association, established a factory at Uttara Kannada (actually the village named Kadwad, situated 6 kilometres (3.7 mi) eastwards on the banks of the Kali river). It was a trade port frequented by traders from Arabia and Africa. Baitkhol port (the current civil port of Uttara Kannada) was known for its natural harbour. The name Baithkhol is an Arabic term, Bait-e-kol, meaning bay of safety. Muslin was the chief commodity purchased but Uttara Kannada was also a source for pepper, cardamom, cassia and coarse blue cotton cloth. Situated on India's west coast, 50 miles south-east of Goa, Uttara Kannada was noted for its safe harbour. In 1649, the Courteen Association united with the British East India Company and Uttara Kannada became a company factory.

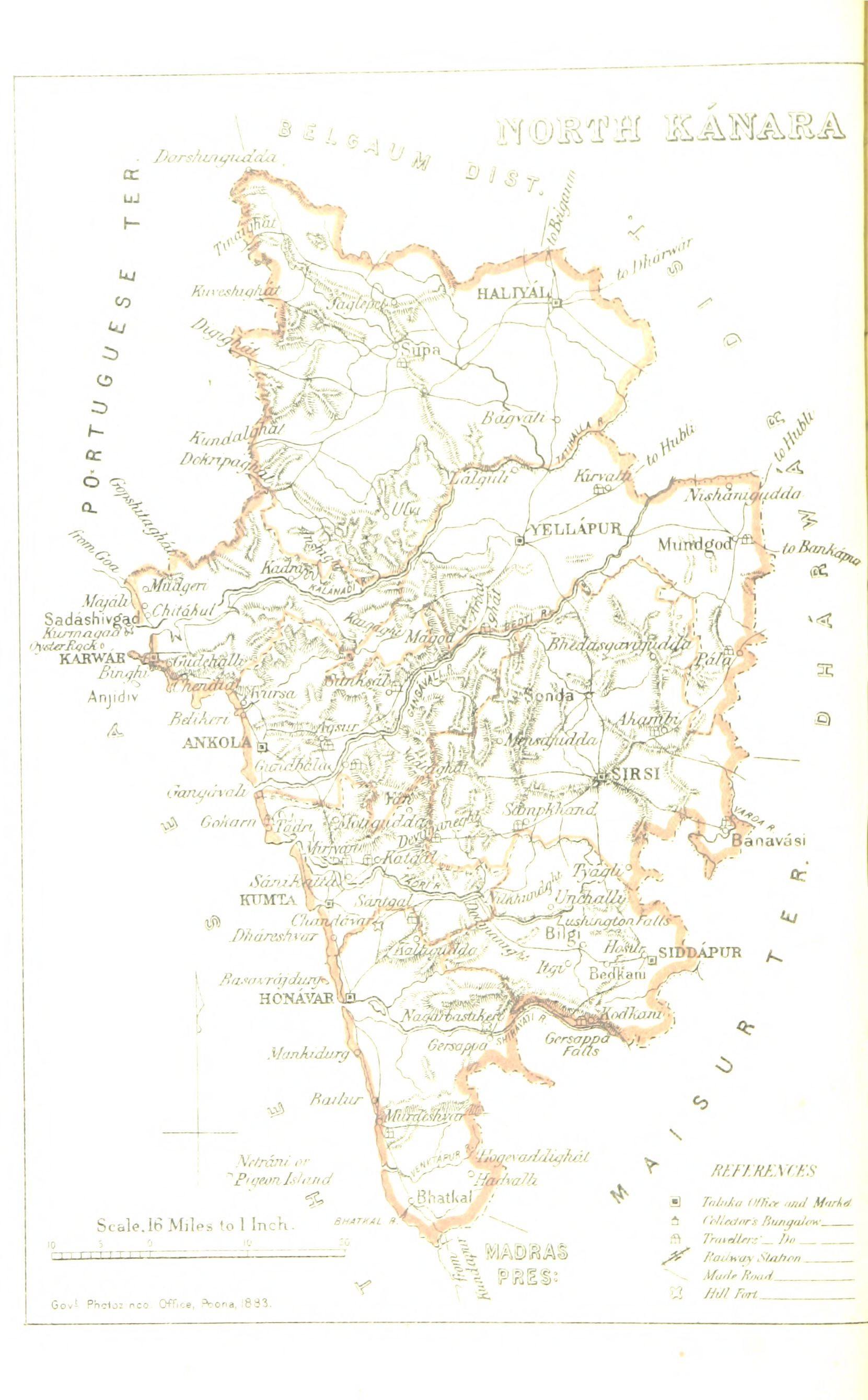
North Kanara, 1896

=== Kingdom of Mysore ===
In the Treaty of Mangalore signed in 1784, between Tipu Sultan and the East India Company, one finds reference to Uttara Kannada and Sadashivgad written as Karwar and Sadasewgude respectively.

Bhatkal and Honnavar were the chief ports of Tipu Sultan in the district.

=== British Raj ===
The Government of British Raj made Carwar the district headquarters of Uttara Kannada in 1862. Since 1862, the time from which it came under Bombay Presidency, Uttara Kannada was described as a first rate harbour between Bombay and Colombo.

=== Maratha Empire ===
It became a part of Maratha territory. It was a part of the Bombay Presidency until 1950.

== Geography and climate ==
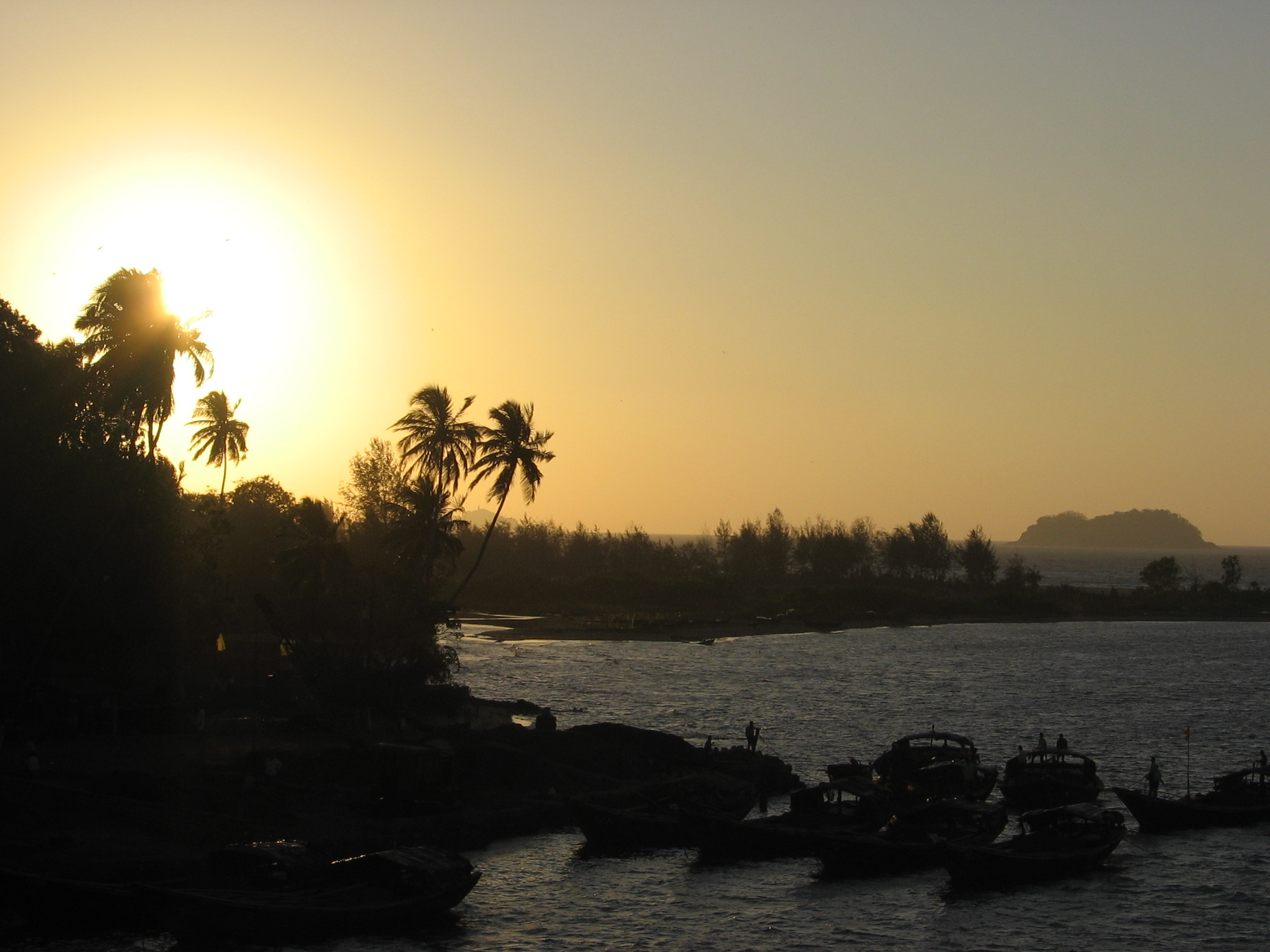
Karwar evening

The main geographic feature of the district is the Western Ghats or Sahyadri range, which runs from north to south through the district. Between the Sahyadris and the sea is a narrow coastal strip, known as the Payanghat, which varies from 8 to 24 kilometres (5.0 to 14.9 mi) in width. Behind the coastal plain are flat-topped hills from 60 to 100 meters in height, and behind the hills are the ridges and peaks of the Sahyadris. East of the Sahyadris is the Balaghat upland, part of the vast Deccan plateau. Moisture-bearing winds come from the west, and yearly rainfall averages 3,000 millimetres (120 in) on the coast, and as high as 5,000 millimetres (200 in) on the west-facing slopes of the Sahyadris. East of the crest is the rain shadow of the Sahyadris, which receive as little as 1,000 millimetres (39 in) annually. Much of the rain falls in the June–September monsoon. Four major rivers drain westwards from the crest of the Sahyadris to the sea; from north to south, they are the Kali, Gangawali, Aghanashini, Sharavati. These rivers form numerous waterfalls, The river Aghanashini drops 116 meters, Magod Falls, where the Bedti river plunges 180 meters in two leaps, Shivganga falls, where the river Sonda (Shalmali) drops 74 meters, and Lalguli falls and Mailmane falls on the river Kali. In the lowlands, these rivers form wide estuaries, extending several kilometers inland from the coast.

== Ecology ==
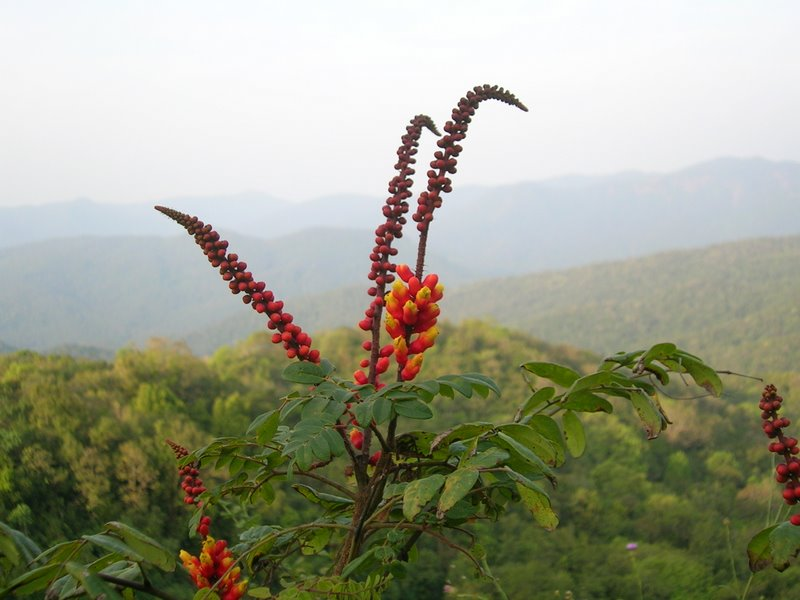
Candy corn plant in the Anshi National Park

The district's high rainfall supports lush forests, which cover approximately 70% of the district. The Malabar Coast moist forests ecoregion lies in a narrow strip between the Arabian Sea and the foothills of the Western Ghats up to 250 meters elevation. These forests have been almost completely converted to agriculture and teak plantations. The North Western Ghats moist deciduous forests cover the Sahyadris from 250 to 1000 meters elevation. Many trees shed leaves in the drier months. Above 1000 meters elevation lie the evergreen North Western Ghats montane rain forests. Wroughton's free-tailed bat (Otomops wroughtoni) is endemic to the forests of Bhimgad Wildlife Sanctuary.

The district is also home to patches of savanna and degraded scrub jungles, which are often the result of overuse for logging or grazing. Much of the lowland has been cleared for agriculture. Mangrove forests can be found in the river estuaries, and the sandy beaches are home to groves of Calophyllum inophyllum, coconut and screw pine (Pandanus). The rocky beaches at Binaga, Honnavara, Arga, Belekeri, Tadadi, Gokarna, Ankola, Kumta, Dhareshwar, Kasarkod, Murdeshwara, Bhatkal and Belke of the district are rich with marine fauna diversity. The beaches at Bhatkal include American Jali Beach, Bahrain Jali Beach, NaStar Beach, Nakhuda Beach, Lighthouse Beach and the rocky Udmudey Beach. The rocky beaches of Uttara Kannada District harbor the invertebrates belonging to the phyla Porifera, Coelenterata, Annelida, Arthropoda, Mollusca and Echinodermata. Attiveri bird sanctuary is home to 79 species of birds including migratory birds from 22 countries.

The Kali Tiger Reserve, which includes Dandeli Wildlife Sanctuary and Anshi National Park, is a protected area in Uttara Kanada. Anshi National Park preserves approximately 250 square kilometres (97 sq mi) of semi-evergreen forest, which is home to the tiger, black panther, leopard cat, gaur, Asian elephant, sambar and a range of birds and reptiles. Dandeli Wildlife Sanctuary protects 834 square kilometres (322 sq mi) of semi-evergreen and bamboo forest in the watershed of the Kali river and its tributaries, the Kaneri and Nagajhari.

Notable places in and around Dandeli include Kavala Caves, Syntheri Rocks, and Sykes Point. Syntheri Rocks is a monolithic granite formation, while Sykes Point is a viewpoint overlooking the Kali River valley. Other natural and religious sites in Uttara Kannada district include Yana, known for its limestone rock formations and the Bhairaveshwara shrine, as well as waterfalls such as Burude Falls, Unchalli Falls, Magod Falls and Sathodi Falls. The Kali River basin also contains several hydroelectric dams, including Supa, Kodasalli, and Kadra, and the Kaiga Atomic Power Station, a nuclear power station operated by the Nuclear Power Corporation of India.

== Economy ==
Uttara Kannada has a Gross Domestic District Product of 530297 Lakh Crores with Karwar and Sirsi being major contributors. Sirsi has the highest per capita income in the district at 54850 followed by Karwar at 44326, while Bhatkal and Haliyal have the lowest.

=== Agriculture ===
The chief crops of the district are rice and areca nut, along with a great diversity of other crops. Tree crops include coconut, sugarcane, cocoa, cashew, mango, banana, pineapple, garcinia, jack fruit, and sapota; vegetables include onion, radish, cucumber, cauliflower, sweet potato, eggplant (brinjal), and amaranth; spices include pepper, cardamom, ginger and nutmeg. Millet and cotton are grown in the drier portion of the district east of the Western Ghats.

Bhatkal is known for its imported goods markets, which existed even before India's liberalisation.

== Commerce and industry ==
- Kaiga Atomic Power Station
- INS Kadamba
- Supa Dam

== Demographics ==
Historical population
Year	Pop.	±% p.a.
1901	454,722	—
1911	430,755	−0.54%
1921	401,928	−0.69%
1931	418,048	+0.39%
1941	441,388	+0.54%
1951	518,062	+1.61%
1961	689,862	+2.91%
1971	849,453	+2.10%
1981	1,073,561	+2.37%
1991	1,220,260	+1.29%
2001	1,353,644	+1.04%
2011	1,437,169	+0.60%

According to the 2011 census, Uttara Kannada has a population of 1,437,169, roughly equal to the nation of Eswatini or the US state of Hawaii. This gives it a ranking of 346th in India (out of a total of 640). The district has a population density of 140 inhabitants per square kilometre (360/sq mi). Its population growth rate over the decade 2001–2011 was 6.15%. Uttara Kannada has a sex ratio of 975 females for every 1000 males. 29.15% of the population lives in urban areas. Scheduled Castes and Scheduled Tribes make up 8.10% and 2.39% of the population respectively.

=== Religion ===
Religion in Uttara Kannada district (2011)
Religion	Percent
Hinduism	82.61%
Islam	13.08%
Christianity	3.10%
Buddhism	0.89%
Other or not stated	0.32%

The population is predominantly Hindu, although a Catholic community has existed here since the 1500s. Muslims are a sizeable minority in Bhatkal Taluk and are majority in Bhatkal City. A small community of Tibetan refugees lives in Mundgod.

=== Language ===
Languages in Uttara Kannada district (2011).
1. Kannada (55.3%)
2. Konkani (18.2%)
3. Urdu (11.8%)
4. Marathi (9.52%)
5. Telugu (1.36%)
6. Others (3.88%)

The main language spoken in this district is Kannada, spoken by 55.34%. Other major languages include Konkani at 18.21%, 11.83% Urdu, 9.52% Marathi and 1.36% Telugu. Marathi speakers are mostly located in Joida and Haliyal taluks in the north and Konkani is in majority in Karwar taluk, although it is spoken throughout the district in lesser numbers. Nawayathi is a Konkani dialect spoken by Nawayath Muslims in Bhatkal and surrounding areas.

Kannada is understood by a vast majority of the population of Uttara Kannada, at around 55%, and understood by almost all of the inhabitants. Konkani is the 2nd most spoken language, with it mainly being spoken in Karwar and other towns of the district. Kannada dialects spoken in the district include Achchagannada or Halakki Kannada spoken by Halakki Gowdas, Nadavar dialect of Kannada spoken by Nadavaru and Havigannada spoken by the Havyakas.

=== Literacy ===
In total about 10.8 lakh people in the district are literate, among them about 5.8 lakh are male and about 5 lakh are female. The literacy rate (children under 6 are excluded) of Uttara Kannada is 84%. 90% of men and 78% of women are literate here. Overall literacy rate in the district has increased by 7%. Male literacy has gone up by 5% and female literacy rate has gone up by 10%.

Rank	Taluk	Literacy
1	Sirsi	94%
2	Karwar	89%
3	Kumta	87%
4	Ankola	85%
5	Siddapur	85%
6	Honnavar	84%
7	Dandeli	83%
8	Bhatkal	83%
9	Yellapur	81%
10	Mundgod	80%
11	Joida	76%
12	Haliyal	74%

== Culture ==
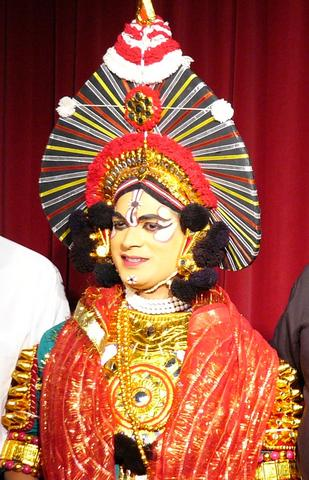
Costume of yakshaghana

Yakshagana is a classical dance drama popular in the state of Karnataka in India mostly popular in the districts of Uttara Kannada. Shimoga, Udupi, Dakshina Kannada and Kasaragod district of Kerala. This theater art involves music, songs, dance, acting, dialogue, story and unique costumes. While songs and dance adhere to well established talas very similar to Indian classical dance forms, acting and dialogues are created spontaneously on stage depending on ability of artists. This combination of classical and folk elements makes yakshagana unique from any other Indian art. This would be considered to be a form of opera in western eyes. Traditionally, yakshaganas used to start late in the night and run for the entire night. Bagavatha, the background singer is also the director of the story and controls the entire proceedings on stage. Bagavatha along with background musicians who play chande and maddale forms himmela. The actors who wear colorful costumes and enact various roles in the story forms mummela. There are many professional troops in Karnataka. In spite of competition from the modern movie industry and TV, these troops are arranging ticketed shows and making profit. Apart from this individuals arrange shows in their village inviting well known professional artists like Sri Chittani Ramachandra Hegde, Kondadakuli Ramachandra Hegde, Gopal Achari Theerthahalli and Ramesh Bhandari Murur, providing an opportunity for local talents to act with legends. Yakshagana is sometimes simply called as aataā in Kannada and khela in Konkani (meaning play in both). Yaksha-gana literally means the song (gana) of a yaksha. Yakshas were an exotic tribe mentioned in the Sanskrit literature of ancient India. The Nawayath men wear lungis unique to them.

== Cuisine ==
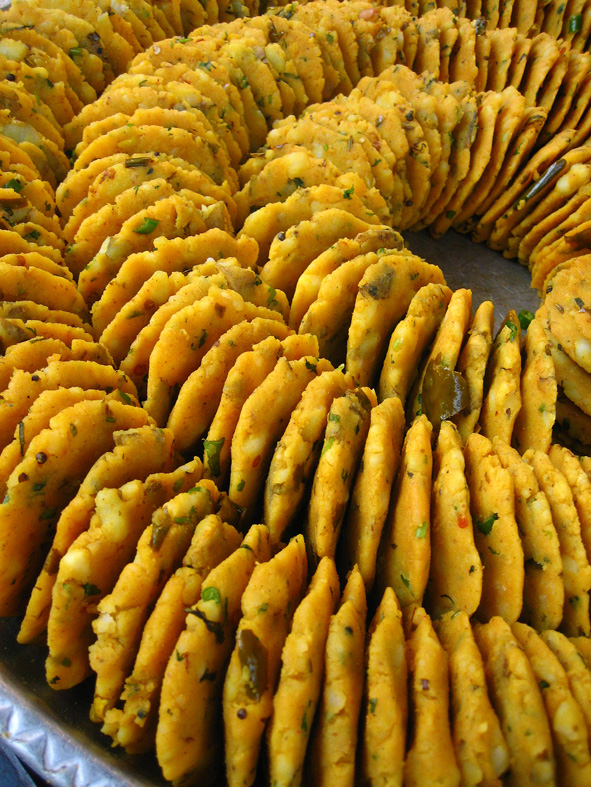
Chotta Ambado

Uttara Kannada is famous for a variety of seafood delicacies. Fish curry and rice is the staple diet of the locals. Cashews and coconut are also extensively used.

The staple diet includes a portion of steamed rice with a vegetable and/or seafood accompaniment. Seafood is immensely popular due to its ease of availability, and is prepared with a lot of local spices. Tea is the most popular beverage and is sometimes supplemented with cardamom or mint to give a distinct flavour.

- Kotte Kadubu: The main ingredients in Kotte Kadubu are jackfruit pulp and jaggery. The batter which is prepared with additional ingredients is put into a container and steamed. This dessert is a local delicacy and is served hot with ghee.
- Holge: These are similar to the sweet equivalents of tortillas. One variant is made with gram flour and jaggery, while the other is made with coconuts.
- Todadevu is a special kind of thin-crust dosa made out of jaggery or sugarcane juice. (Most local desserts of Sirsi have jaggery rather than sugar.)
- Shira: is rice cooked in sugar, ghee, and semolina.
- Karakali: is a special kind of spicy chutney prepared from colocasia leaves.
- Kotte Roti: A form of idli-like preparation, steam cooked in a conical shaped container constructed using jackfruit leaves.
- Patrode: a special dish prepared by steaming stuffed colocasia leaves.
- Neer Dose: A soft thin pancake made of batter of boiled rice, coconut milk and salt.
- Kajmiji
- Koli Kajjaya and Hosagere Kajjaya are made of rice flour and fried in oil is a famous dish often using roti. Often served with thick potato sambar or Nati chicken curry, it is a delicacy among the non-vegetarian communities in Siddapura.
- Banana Buns
- Hanchina Rotti
- Ankola Koli Saaru
- Appe Huli
- Patholi
- Kalali Masala
- Genasle
- Bhatkal Biryani
- Tambli

== Transport ==
=== Public transport ===
North West Karnataka Transport Corporation (NWKRTC) is the state transport agency in the district. The NWKRTC covers all towns and villages of the district. There is a good network of public transport which connects the villages to the towns of the district. There are regular intra state services to major cities & towns of the state like Bangalore, Mangalore, Shimoga, Mysore, Hubli-Dharwad and Belgaum. The Kadama Transport buses of neighboring Goa state provide regular service from Karwar to Mangalore and all parts of Goa state. Kumta, Bhatkal and Sirsi are the main hubs for public transport which provides services to intra-district and intrastate round the clock.

Many private transport buses also provide services for inter / intra state from the district. Bhatkal is the main sector for private transport in the district. The NH-66 which passes through the district which connects Panvel near Mumbai to Kerala state, many private buses are plying on this Highway which provides inter-intra state services to places like Bombay, Poona, Kolhapore, Belgaum, Panaji, Margao, Udupi, Mangalore, Bangalore, Mysore, Bhatkal, Kasaragod, Cannanore, Calicut etc.

=== Railways ===
The following Railways pass through the district:

- Konkan Railway which connects Mangalore and Mumbai via Kumta, Bhatkal, Karwar, Ratnagiri and Panvel.
- Londa to Vasco Railway line which passes through Castle Rock
- Castle rock to Dandeli Railway line.
- Hubli -Ankola railway line is proposed to link Karwar port and northern Karnataka.
- Honnavar -Talaguppa, Shimoga railway line is proposed to link Karwar port and the central part of Karnataka.
- Sirsi -Haveri railway line is proposed to link Malnad region.
- Sirsi- Siddapur-Talaguppa, Shimoga railway line is proposed to link Shimoga.
- RO-RO (Roll on/Roll off) services is provided by Konkan Railway to / from Ankola railway station to Suratkal Railway station. Many truckers use this facility between Ankola and Mangalore.

=== Ports ===
Uttara Kannada being one of the coastal districts of the Karnataka state has a coast of 120 kilometres (75 mi) and has many ports which are used for sea trade, naval base, fishing and other maritime activities.

- Karwar Port is an intermediate sea port the main activities of this port are berthing of ocean going ships, coastal shipping, and fishing jetty. A ship bunkering facility is also available at Karwar port.
- Karwar Airport will be built by the Indian Navy at Alageri village. Naval air base which is part of the Navy's Rs 10,000 crore Phase 2 of Project Seabird
- INS Kadamba is a naval base at Arga village of Karwar which is used exclusively for berthing of naval vessels. A naval ship repair yard (dry docks) is also attached to it.
- Belkeri Port is an anchorage port.
- Tadri Port is a fishing port.
- Kumta Port is a fishing port.
- Honnavar Port is a fishing port.
- Bhatkal Port is a fishing port. It was actually Project Seabird which is now in Karwar. People protested and proposed its withdrawal. There is another fishing port called Tengingundy Port.

The Proposed Hubli-Ankola railway line can be a feasible venture for the future developments of the ports in the district, for movement of the cargo, at present roads are the only major mode of cargo movement which leads to congestion of the National Highways of the district.

=== Nearby airports ===
- Goa International Airport
- Mangalore International Airport
- Hubli Airport
- Belgaum Airport

== Partition movement ==
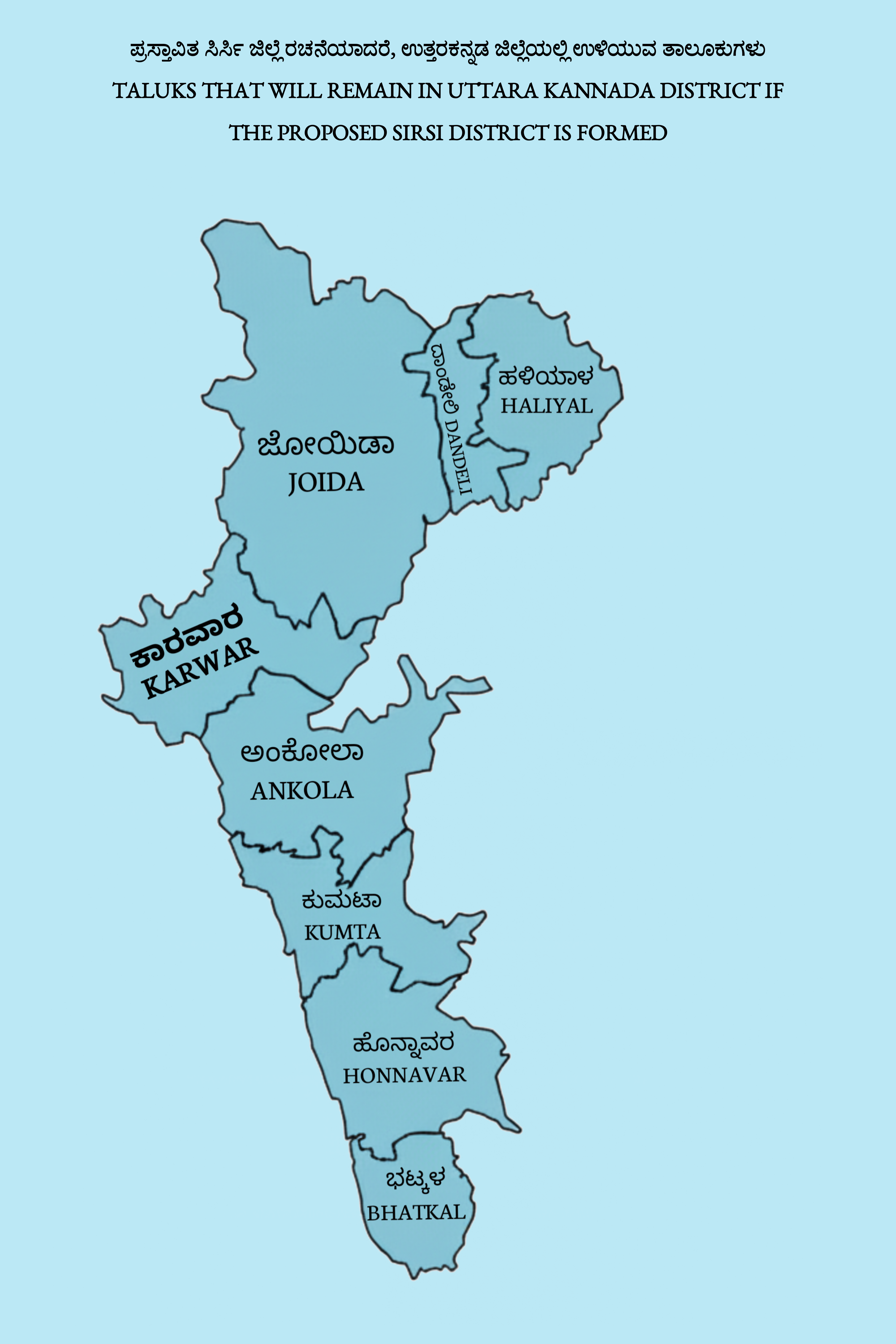
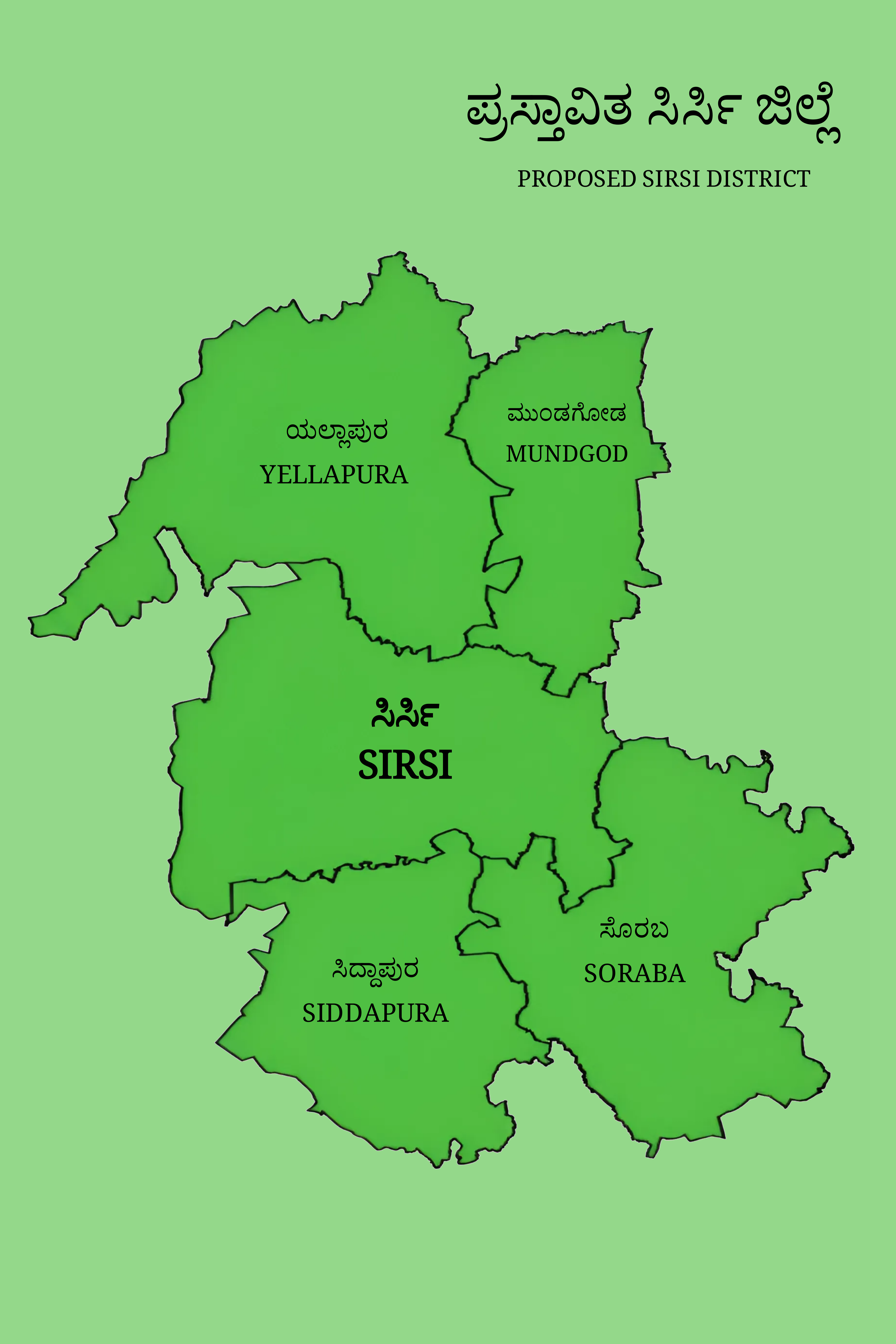

The decades-long campaign for a separate Sirsi district from the sprawling Uttara Kannada district in Karnataka is rooted in geography and administrative necessity, dating back to the 1980s. Uttara Kannada is one of Karnataka's largest districts by area, spanning the coastal belt and the elevated Western Ghats (Malenadu). The primary grievance is the location of the district headquarters in Karwar, a significant distance—approximately 144 kilometers—from Sirsi, the prominent city in the higher ghat region. This considerable travel distance, compounded by the challenging terrain of the ghat section, has historically led to poor access to district administration for residents of interior taluks like Sirsi, Siddapur, Yellapur, and Mundgod. Proponents argue that the district's colossal size, exceeding 10,000 square kilometers, inherently hinders effective governance and the equitable distribution of development funding across its two distinct geographic zones.

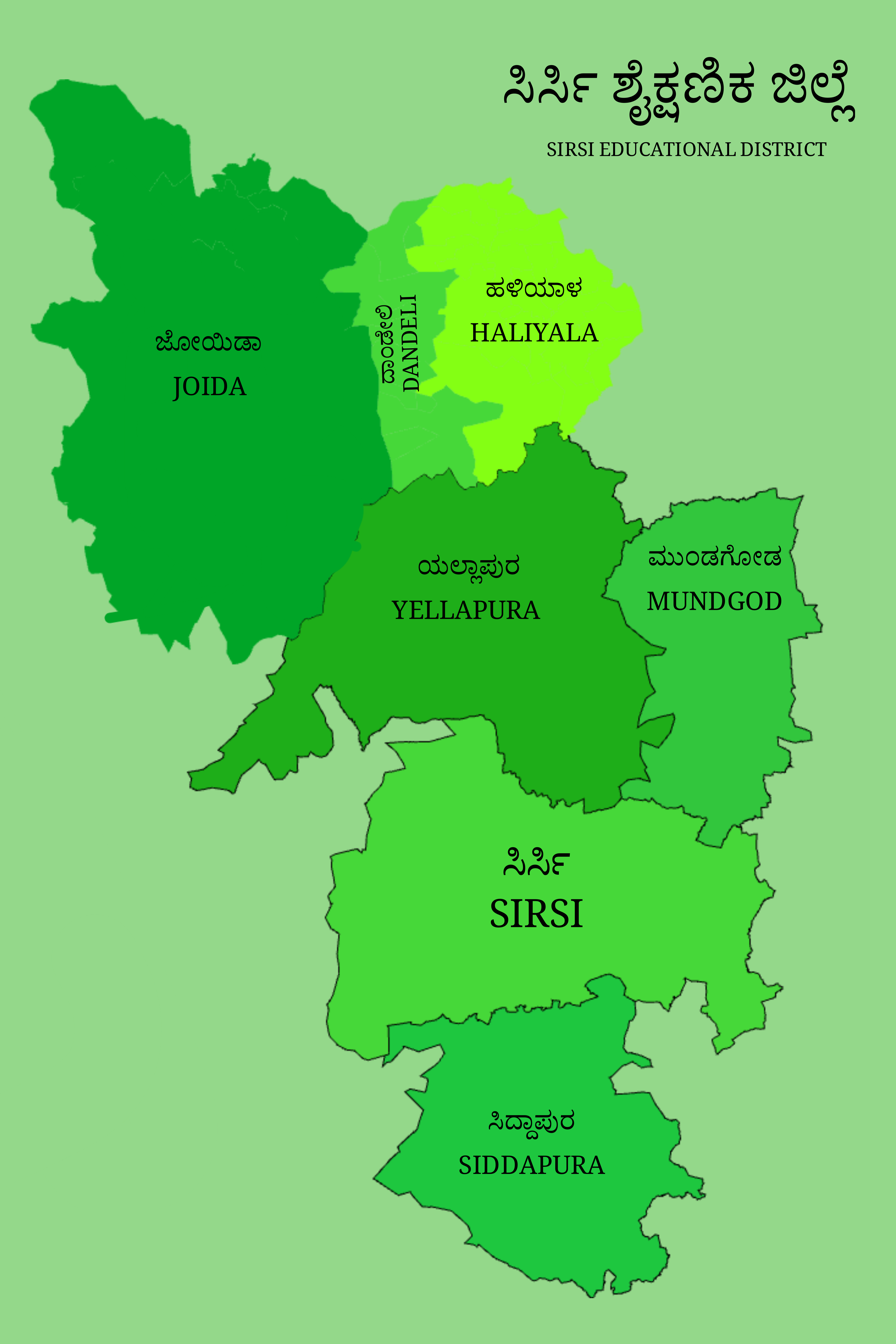

The demand for district status for Sirsi was, in fact, an active consideration during the significant district reorganisations of the 1990s, when Udupi district was carved out of Dakshina Kannada and Haveri district was created from Dharwad district. However, the decision to grant Sirsi district status was reportedly shelved by the state government at the time, largely due to two key factors: the lack of political consensus from local leaders, and the sensitive, long-standing Karnataka-Maharashtra border dispute. Although Uttara Kannada's northern taluks do not physically border Maharashtra, the state of Maharashtra has historically laid claim to areas like Karwar and surrounding regions, making any division of the district a geopolitically sensitive matter that the government was unwilling to pursue. The foundational intellectual work for this Sirsi district movement was laid by figures such as Dr. V.S. Sonde in the 1990s, with organized efforts, under leaders like N.S. Hegde Malenalli, accelerating in the early 2000s. A notable advocate for this movement is, Vishweshwar Hegde Kageri, a Sirsi ex-MLA and former Karnataka Assembly Speaker, attempted to leverage his power to formalize the division in 2008 by establishing a separate Sirsi educational district and relocating some district offices from Karwar. However, these adjustments were swiftly nullified following a political transition influenced by the Karwar-aligned minister R. V. Deshpande (MLA for Haliyal), highlighting the immediate political barriers and regional pushback. A key public action occurred on 3 November 2010, when the Nutana Zilla Horata Samiti, led by Malenalli and M.M. Bhat, presented a memorandum to CM through assistant commissioner proposing to divide Uttara Kannada into a coastal district at Karwar and a Malenadu district centered in Sirsi. The movement faces significant internal challenges from regional fragmentation and complex political dynamics. The core demand is driven by a distinct cultural and economic divide, as Sirsi is the recognized cultural, linguistic, and economic capital of Uttara Kannada's Malenadu areas, with its dominance in the Business activities strengthening its case for economic viability as a separate district. However, notable opposition comes from Haliyal, Joida, and Dandeli taluks. Despite their geographical location in the Western Ghats region, these areas are culturally inclined towards Karwar and, critically, are logistically and economically tied to the Hubballi-Dharwad city. This proximity gives instant access to advanced healthcare, education, and major markets at Hubli Dharwad for Haliyal, Dandeli, Joida residents, making the proposed Sirsi-centered district an unappealing administrative shift for them. Crucially, the political resistance is spearheaded by figures like R.V. Deshpande, the long term incumbent MLA for Haliyal, who has historically opposed the division of Uttara Kannada.

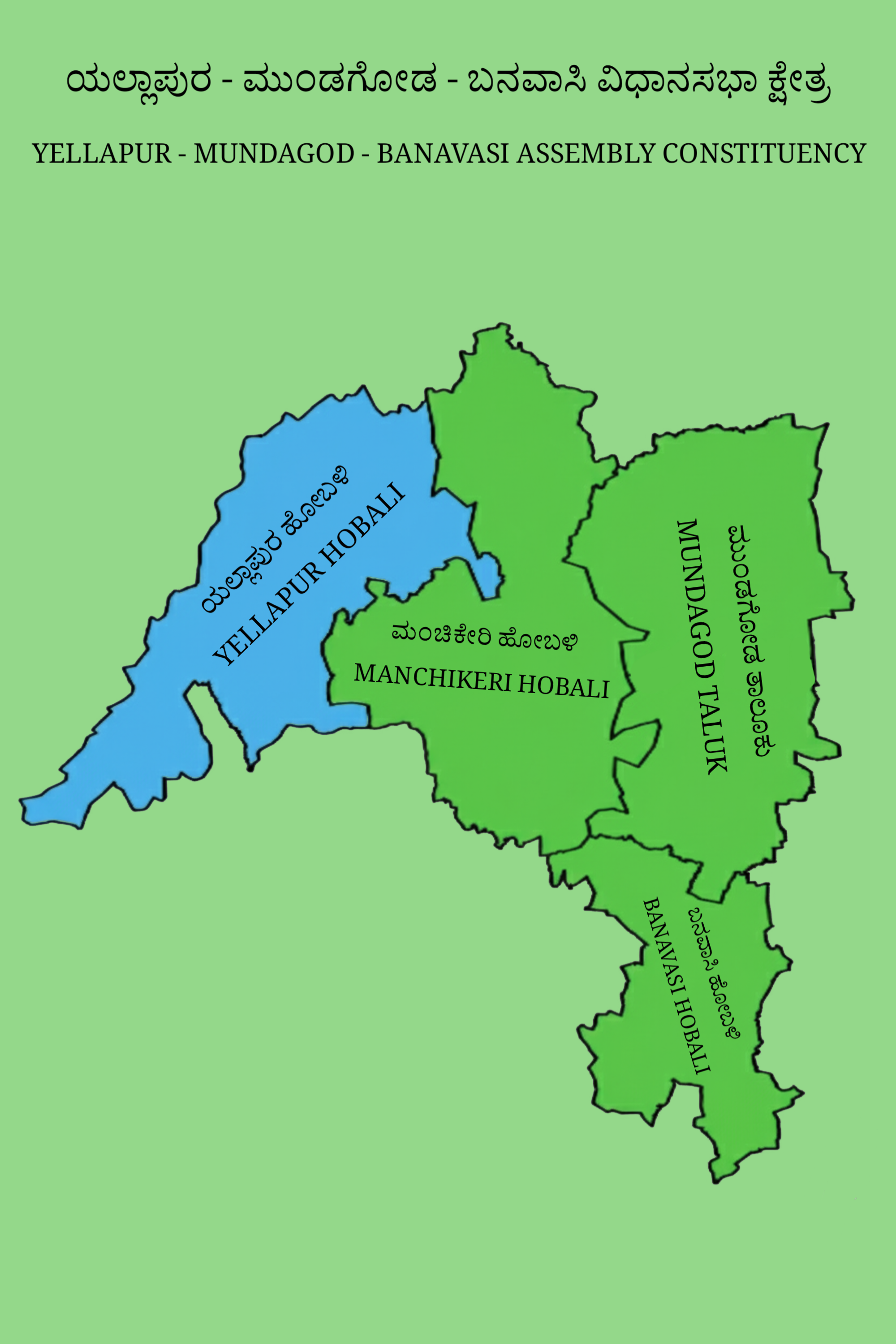
Yellapur-Mundagod-Banavasi

While Sirsi-Siddapur MLA are strong supporters for the new district, the MLA for the Yellapur constituency, Shivaram Hebbar, has maintained a cautious neutrality. His neutral stance is becoming increasingly difficult to sustain, as his constituency includes Mundgod Taluk, the Manchikeri hobli of Yellapur taluk, and the Banavasi hobli of Sirsi taluk which are strong supporters of Sirsi District, the substantial electoral influence of this places of Yellapur Assembly constituency compel the Yellapur MLA to address the demand.

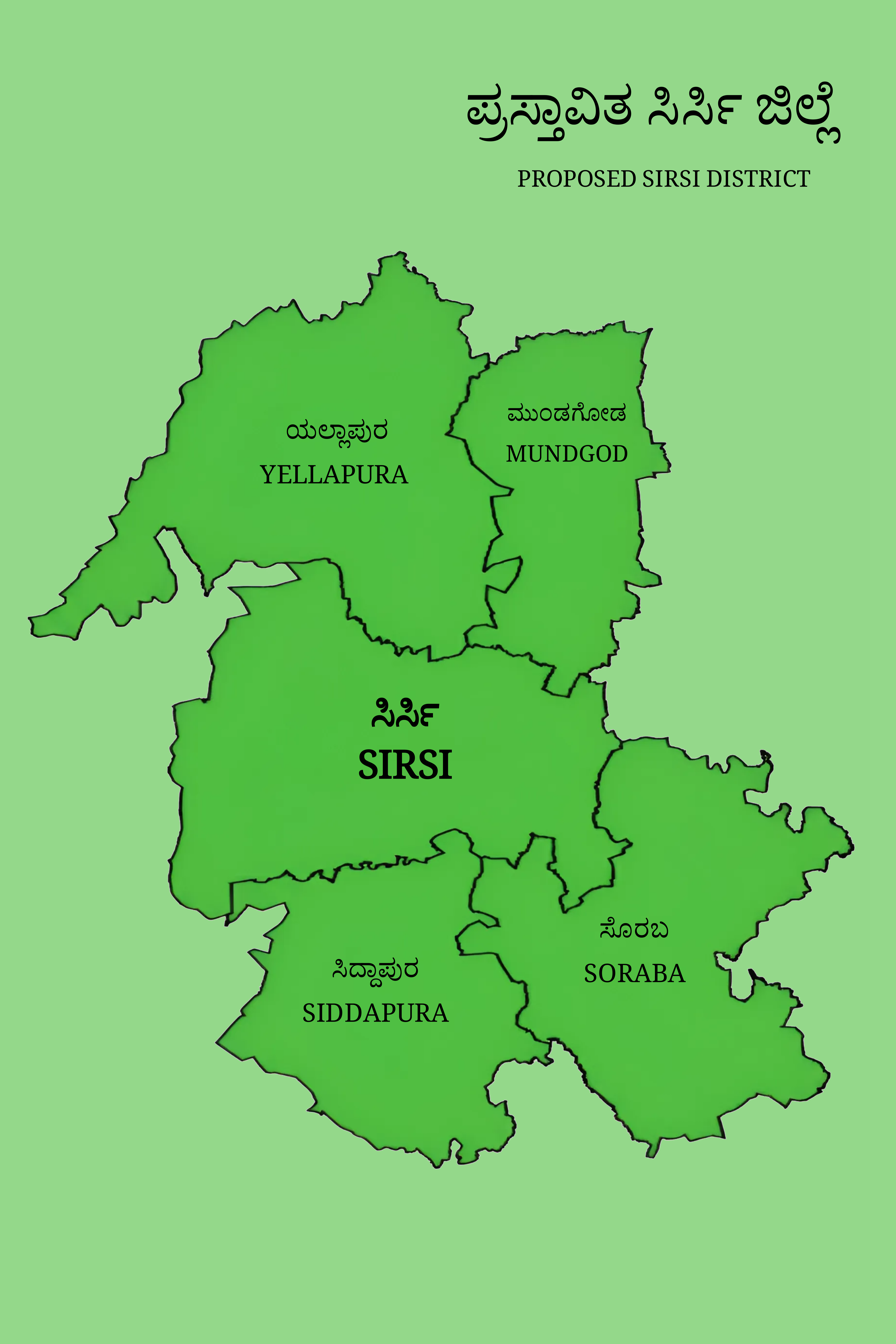

In response to this regional opposition and political inertia, activists adopted a revised, pragmatic strategy focused on a more geographically compact New Sirsi District that would including Sirsi, Siddapur, Mundgod, and Yellapur from the Sirsi subdivision and inclusion of the Soraba Taluk from the neighbouring Shivamogga district. This new strategic proposal holds a massive advantage over previous attempts, as the taluks of Haliyal, Dandeli, and Joida – which strongly prefer Karwar and are sensitive to border dispute concerns—would remain part of the existing Uttara Kannada district, thereby avoiding entanglement with the sensitive inter-state border issue by limiting the division to the Sirsi region. The revised proposal is built on proximity and administrative efficiency, positioning Sirsi as the strategically central and advantageous location for the new district headquarters. The short road distances between Sirsi and its potential taluk headquarters are remarkably persuasive, with Siddapur is just 38 km, Soraba is 47 km, Yellapur is 49 km, and Mundgod is 55 km away This geographical configuration, with all major constituent taluk headquarters situated within a roughly 55 km radius of the proposed district centre, strongly supports the case for highly effective and accessible local governance.

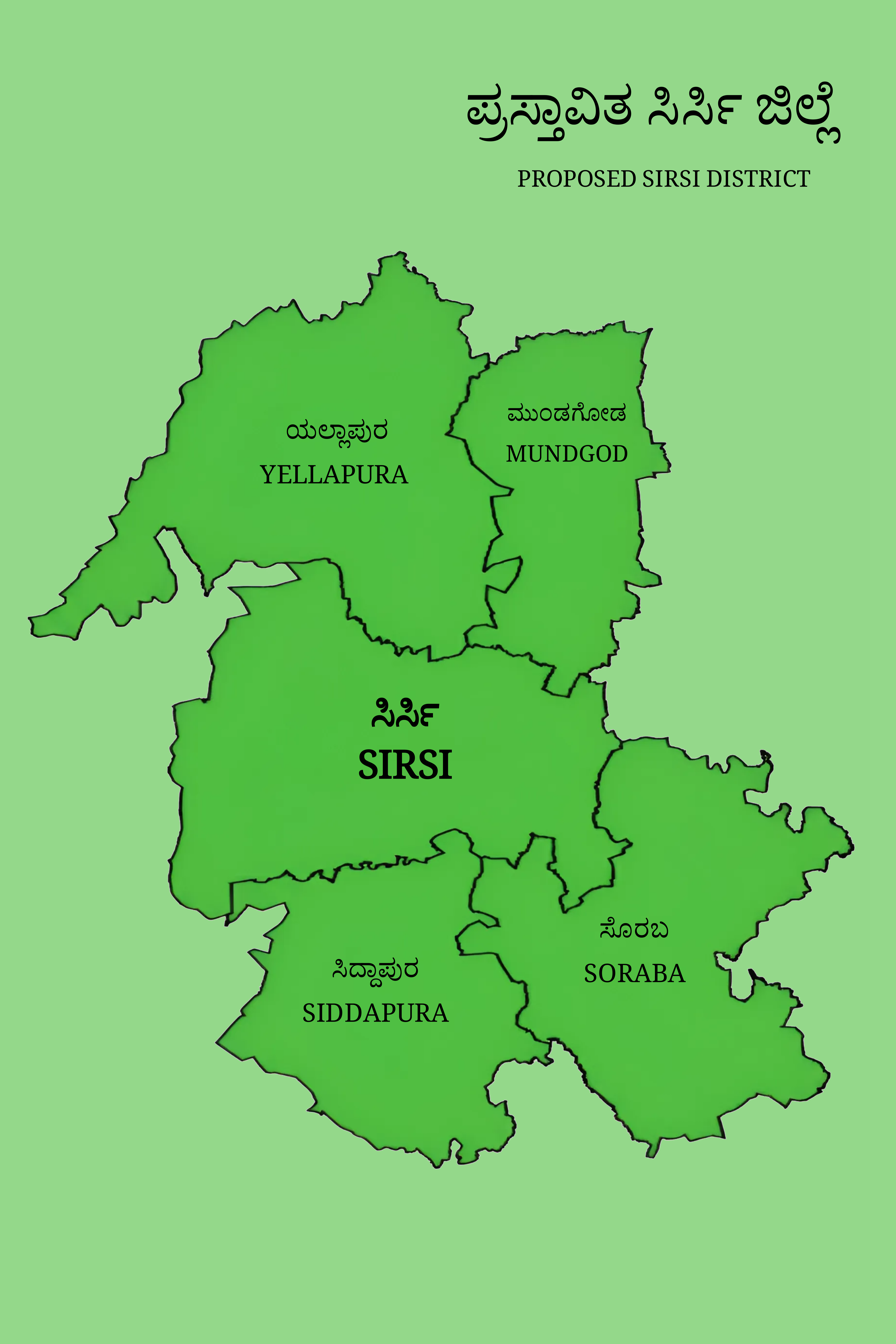
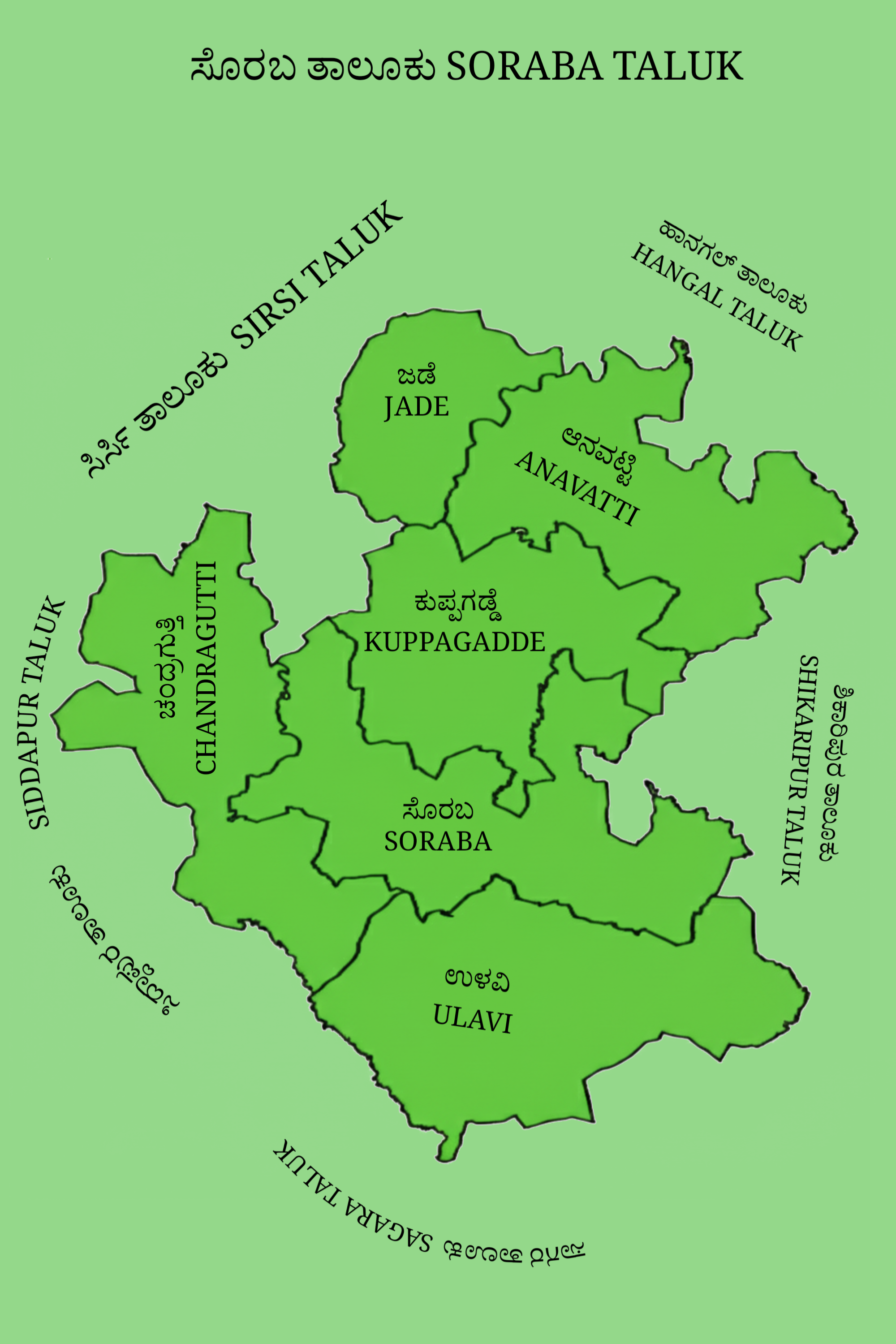
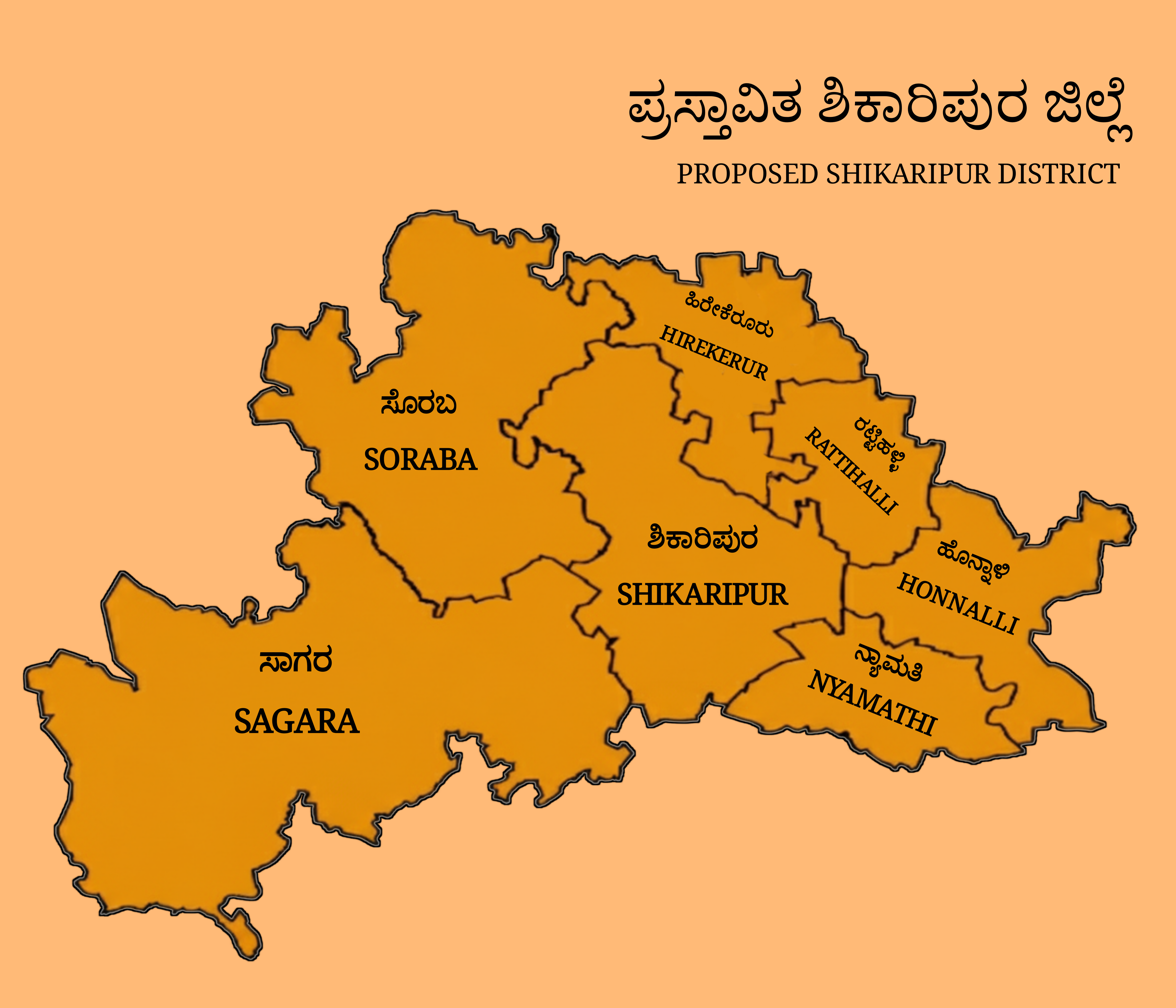

The rationale for incorporating Soraba lies in the strong socio-economic and geographical proximity of its hoblis—Jade, Chandragutti, and Kuppagadde—which are immediate neighbors of Sirsi Taluk and rely on Sirsi as their primary commercial and social hub. This strategic move is significantly bolstered by the complex and turbulent political dynamics surrounding the inevitable bifurcation of Shivamogga district when BJP regains the Power in the State. The Shikaripur District demand is primarily promoted by B. S. Yediyurappa in 2009 when he became Chief minister of the state. The Shikaripur district is by including neighboring taluks of Hirekerur and Rattihalli (of Haveri district) and Nymathi and Honnali (of Davanagere district),and Soraba, this proposal as strong political backing due to BSY's influence across this cluster of regions and State level political influence of his family. Conversely, the counter-proposal to establish a district headquartered at Sagara is primarily a political counter to the Shikaripur demand, lacking a strong logistical or intellectual foundation. This Sagara proposal is inherently vulnerable due to the alignment of its neighboring taluks: major parts of Hosanagara are better connected to Shimoga city than Sagara; Shikaripur maintains its own strong district demand with high political influence in the state; and Siddapur is part of the Sirsi constituency. This vulnerability, compounded by the fact that Sagara's overall political influence is considered weaker than BSY's. The Soraba Taluk's geographical position doesn't share direct border with Shimoga taluk, Shikaripur Taluk is located middle of it, if shikarpur became new district when BJP regains power in the state the Soraba have no choice to remain in Shimoga district, which forces Soraba's politicians to choose an alignment with Shikaripur or Sirsi. The strong political, social, caste equation, and direct geography of the Jade,Chandragutti and Kuppagadde hoblis of Soraba makes them far more inclined towards the Sirsi proposal, The political tension between the Bangarappa and Yediyurappa families is a long-standing, generational rivalry for supremacy in this region. offering the politically dominant Bangarappa family in Soraba a crucial strategic mechanism to reduce the BSY family's influence in Soraba Taluk by aligning the region with Sirsi rather than the BSY-backed Shikaripur proposal.

Media reports from December 2022 captured the growing public sentiment and demand for the immediate declaration of Sirsi as a new district headquarter. Post-2023 Election Mandate: The sophisticated strategy is currently amplified by the highly favourable political climate following the 2023 Karnataka Legislative Assembly election. The victory of the incumbent Sirsi MLA, Bhimanna T. Naik (Indian National Congress), who campaigned on the promise of a Sirsi district, over the long-serving incumbent Vishweshwar Hegde Kageri (BJP), is widely interpreted as an electoral mandate for bifurcation. Furthermore, the current State Government is led by the Congress party, and both the Sirsi MLA (Bhimanna Naik) and the Soraba MLA, Madhu Bangarappa (a family relative of Naik), belong to the ruling party, potentially simplifying inter-district political coordination. In October 2024, activists, including the convenor of the Sirsi Pratyeka Zilla Horata Samiti (Sirsi Separate District Struggle Committee), M.M. Bhat Karekoppa, and activist Ananthamurthy Hegde, announced plans to strengthen the agitation across the ghat taluks. This renewed push was partially triggered by perceived governmental indifference towards establishing essential facilities like a Super Speciality Hospital in the region, which solidified the view that a separate administrative unit is necessary. The activists specifically contacted sitting MLA Bhimanna Naik, MP Vishweshwar Hegde Kageri, and JD(S) leader Upendra Pai to create a unified, non-partisan front for the struggle, visiting every taluk headquarters to build support. The efforts gained high-level public notice in December 2024, when Karnataka Minister Shivaraj Tangadagi publicly acknowledged the long-pending demand and stated his intention to urge the Chief Minister and Revenue Minister to prioritize the matter for the benefit of the people. As of November 2025, despite the convergence of political pressures, a detailed geopolitical strategy, and a recent high-level political acknowledgment, the Karnataka government has not taken any official step towards granting Sirsi district status. The history of this movement remains one of continuous local ambition encountering intricate logistical, political, and complex regional issues.

== Notable people ==
- Pandari Bai, actress
- Leena Chandavarkar, actress
- Yashwant Vithoba Chittal
- Dinakara Desai
- Shantinath Desai
- Jayshree Gadkar, Marathi movie actress
- Dr. Sannappa Parameshwar Gaonkar, Deputy Chief Minister in B. G. Kher's Cabinet of the State of Bombay
- Chittani Ramachandra Hegde, Yakshagana artist
- Keremane Shivarama Hegde, Yakshagana artist
- Ramakrishna Hegde, two-term Chief Minister of Karnataka
- Narayan Sadashiv Hosmane
- M. M. Jalisatgi, activist and politician
- Gourish Kaikini, author and teacher
- Jayanth Kaikini
- Gurudas Kamat, politician
- Mynavathi, Kannada actress
- Sundar V. Nadkarni
- Anant Nag, actor
- Shankar Nag, actor and director
- K. R. Naik, businessman founder of D-Link
- Kashinath Naik, Commonwealth medallist
- Dr. N. K. Naik, professor emeritus at IIT Bombay
- Gopalkrishna P. Nayak, drama writer
- Govindray H. Nayak, author and Sahitya Akademi Award awardee
- Justice S. R. Nayak, Chief Justice of Karnataka High Court
- Nandan Nilekani, businessman
- Radhika Pandit, actress
- Anuradha Paudwal, singer
- Major Rama Raghoba Rane, Param Veer Chakra awardee
- Vilas Sarang
- R. N. Shetty, industrialist
- Kamala Siddi, former track and field athlete
