= Special Area Games Scheme =

Scheme of Government of India

The Special Area Games Scheme (also known as the Special Area Games Programme; abbreviated to SAG Scheme and SAG Programme or SAGP) is a sports promotion scheme of the Sports Authority of India (SAI) that is designed to identify and train sports persons from the communities in the tribal, rural, hilly and coastal regions of the country who are considered to exhibit natural physical aptitude for sporting events. The programme was started in 1986 by the Department of Youth Affairs and Sports of the Government of India but was suspended six years later in 1993 and was not resumed until 2014.

Before being admitted to one of the twenty SAG Centres, a selected trainee is required to go through the preliminary selection and an assessment by the field experts at special coaching camps. Under the scheme, various population groups have been scouted for their innate sporting talent. Its first project, which was launched in November 1986 to find contestants for archery among the communities of traditional hunters was successful; within a year of commencement, nine of the top-ten archers of India were the discoveries of this project. The programme attracted criticism for being focused exclusively on those population groups that were considered to have a natural advantage over others.

The scheme covers 26 sporting disciplines; except for kabaddi, netball, sepaktakraw and wushu, these are Olympic sports. Selected trainees are trained at the SAG Sports Centres; these facilities were developed after SAI consulted with the state governments where they are located. Assam, Bihar, Kerala, Manipur and Odisha each have two of these centres.

== Scheme ==
The Special Area Games Scheme is a sports promotion scheme of the Sports Authority of India in which children and young adults aged 12–18 who are considered to exhibit natural physical aptitude in sporting events are identified and trained. The age criterion is relaxed for "exceptional cases".

The population groups covered by the scheme are from the regions of the country in which communities from the tribal, rural, hilly and coastal areas are either genetically talented or possess distinct geographic advantage in sporting events. After preliminary selection, the potential trainees are assessed in special coaching camps under the supervision of field experts including coaches, former sports persons and sports scientists. After a successful assessment, trainees are admitted to an SAG Centre. Trainees have access to expert coaches, sports equipment and clothing, boarding and lodging facilities, competition at both national and international arenas, educational expenses, medical and insurance, and stipend.

== History ==
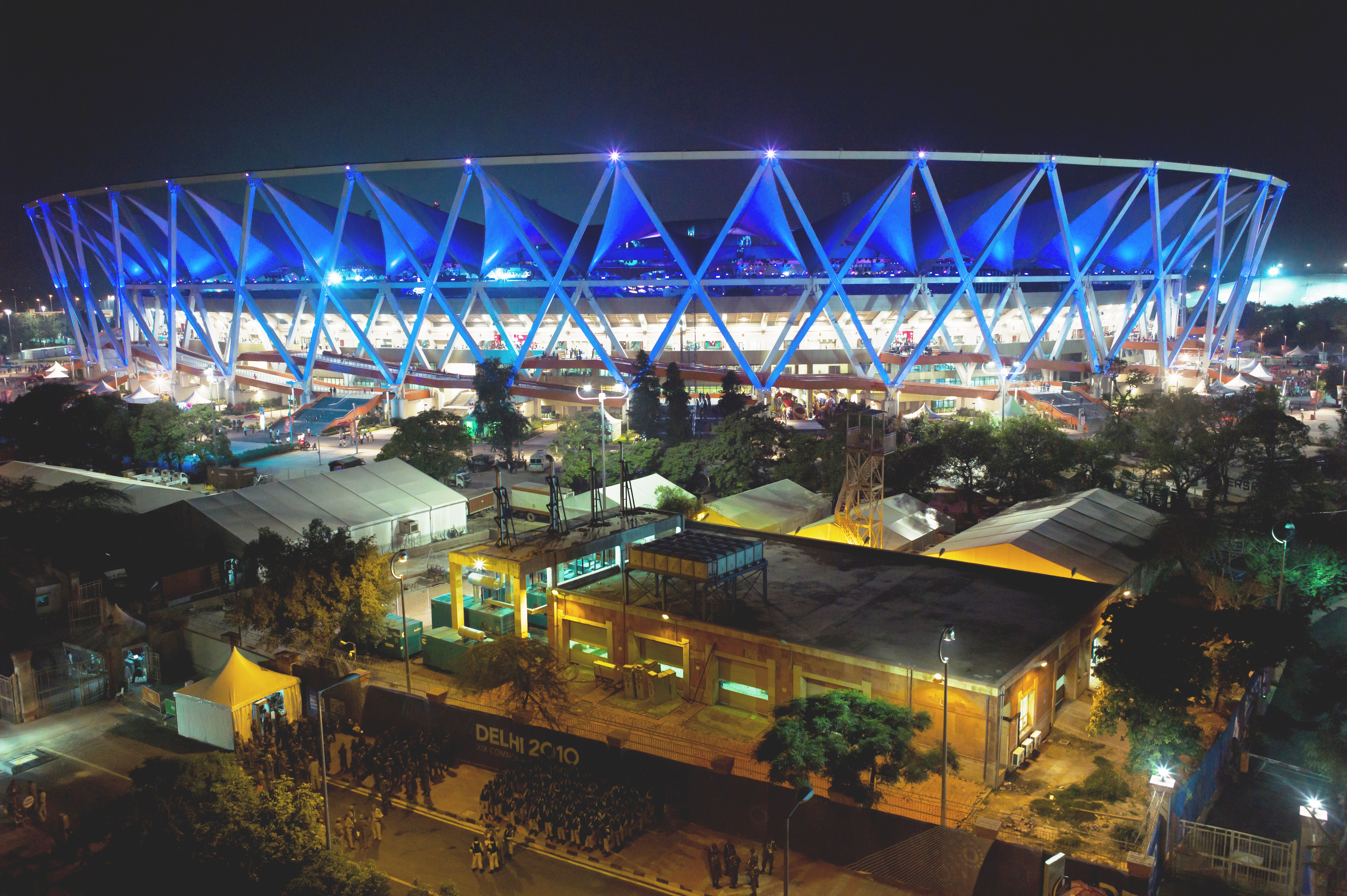
Selected trainees were trained at Jawaharlal Nehru Stadium, New Delhi, which also acted as the laboratory of the programme

The programme was started by the Government of India's Department of Youth Affairs and Sports in 1986 in New Delhi. The Sports Authority of India was its implementing agency. The scheme was initiated by B. V. P. Rao, an Indian Administrative Service officer on special duty to the Sports Authority of India. A special committee composed of SAI officials was constituted for close monitoring and management of the programme, which was headed by the Union Minister of Youth and Sports and Women and Child Development Margaret Alva.

Population groups were scouted for their innate talent in sporting events. Among them were the Siddis, an African-origin community, for the track and field events of athletics, especially medium-distance and long-distance running. Tribes of Bihar (now in Jharkhand after the division of Bihar) and Rajasthan, who are accustomed to bowhunting skills, were scouted for talent in modern competitive archery, and fishing communities of coastal Kerala, who are proficient in boating, were scouted for rowing, kayaking and canoeing. A "height hunt" talent search was carried out in Rajasthan with a criterion of height 6 feet (1.8 m) and above for boys aged 14 to 18 years for the sports in which height can be a factor for success.

The first project under the programme was launched in November 1986 to find contestants for archery among the communities of traditional hunters. The quest resulted in the discovery of Shyam Lal Meena and Limba Ram, both of them belonging to the Adivasi communities of Rajasthan, later won Arjuna Award for archery in 1989 and 1991, respectively. The project proved to be successful within a year; with the exception of Sanjeeva Kumar Singh, all of the top-ten archers of the country were the discoveries of the SAG programme.

Selectors invited applications to the programme through an advertisement in a local newspaper in Alleppey district, Kerala, which is famous for traditional boat racing known as Vallam Kali. The programme aimed to find prospective competitors for rowing, canoeing and kayaking and it attracted 800 applicants. The SAG Centre Alleppey was opened in 1987 after the conclusion of the annual Vallam Kali competition; 180 applicants were called for interview but only 17 of them were selected to be trained under the scheme.

The Khasi Tournaments or the Khasi Cup (literally: the Goat Cup) are organised in the tribal belt of Jharkhand, Odisha and Madhya Pradesh in which the winner of the tournament is awarded with a goat. It is a tribal version of field hockey for which makeshift curved bamboo sticks and cork balls are used. Selectors of the programme organised 31 tournaments over eight weeks, and scrutinised 15,000 players, prior to a final selection tournament held in April 1988 at Gumla, Bihar (now in Jharkhand). The best teams were invited at Gumla and 42 boys and 28 girls were chosen by ex-Olympians, Balbir Singh Sr. and Michael Kindo, for training in Delhi.

== Criticism, suspension and revival of the scheme ==
Sports federations in India objected to the programme for being focused exclusively on population groups that were considered to possess natural advantage over others in particular sports. Lack of similar schemes for those who were interested in sports but did not belong to any tribal group or have the habitat-related advantage was presented as another criticism. After running for six years, the programme was suddenly suspended in 1993.

Some former athletes and representatives of Siddi community attempted to revive the scheme; their efforts persuaded the Union Government in 2014 when it allotted ₹11.5 crore (US$1.3 million) for the financial year 2014–15 to implement the programme. In the following years, the amount was successively raised, except in 2016–17 when it was ₹12.75 crore (US$1.5 million), ₹25 lakh (US$29,000) less than the allotment for the year 2015–16.

== Disciplines covered ==
The SAG programme covers in total 26 sporting disciplines including archery, athletics, badminton, basketball, boxing, canoeing, cycling, fencing, football, gymnastics, handball, field hockey, judo, kabaddi, karate, kayaking, netball, rowing, sepaktakraw, shooting, swimming, taekwondo, volleyball, weightlifting, wrestling, and wushu. Barring kabaddi, netball, sepaktakraw and wushu, the remaining 22 sports are Olympic sports.

== Sports centres ==
Under the Special Area Games Scheme, after consulting with the respective state governments, twenty sports centres have been established by the Ministry of Sports in fourteen states. State governments are required to provide requisite land with infrastructure. The Sports Authority of India constructs the facility if it is unavailable in any state provided the state government leases a developed land to SAI for a long duration. Assam, Bihar, Kerala, Manipur and Odisha each have two SAG sports centres. Arunachal Pradesh, Jammu and Kashmir, Jharkhand, Mizoram, Sikkim, Tamil Nadu, Telangana, Tripura and West Bengal each have one sports centre.

Sl. No.	SAG Centre	Location
1	1 EME Centre, Secunderabad	Secunderabad, Telanaga
2	SAG Alleppey	Alleppey, Kerala
3	SAG Tellicherry	Tellicherry, Kerala
4	SAG Mayiladuthurai	Mayiladuthurai, Tamil Nadu
5	SAG Kargil	Kargil, Jammu and Kashmir
6	SAG Imphal	Imphal, Manipur
7	SAG Utlov	Bishenpur district, Manipur
8	SAG Aizawl	Aizawl, Mizoram
9	SAG Jagatpur	Jagatpur, Odisha
10	SAG Sundergarh	Sundergarh, Odisha
11	SAG Port Blair	Port Blair, Andman and Nicobar
12	SAG Ranchi	Ranchi, Jharkhand
13	SAG Krishanganj	Kishanganj, Bihar
14	SAG Giddaur	Gidhaur, Bihar
15	SAG Bolpur	Bolpur, Birbhum district, West Bengal
16	SAG Agartala	Agartala, Tripura
17	SAG Namchi	South Sikkim, Sikkim
18	SAG Naharlagan	Naharlagun, Arunachal Pradesh
19	SAG Kokrajhar	Kokrajhar, Assam
20	SAG Tinsukhia	Tinsukia, Assam
