= Narasinganavar family =

Patriarchal Jain family of Karnataka, India

The Narasinganavar family is a patriarchal Jain family of about 206 individuals who are residing together in the village of Lokur in the Dharwad district of Karnataka, India. All the individuals in the family share a common ancestry and this family is recognised as one of the largest undivided families in the world. The family spans across five generations and lives in two adjacent houses in the village. Bhimanna Jinapa Narasinganavar is the patriarch of the family and the entire family has lunch and dinner together. This is an extreme example of the joint family system that is in vogue in India.

== Origin ==
Narasinganavar, the pater familias of the family originally belonged to the Hatkal Angada village near Miraj in Maharashtra. He was a wrestler and once visited the Durga temple at Lokur. Allegedly, it was Durga who instructed him to shift base to Lokur. He purchased a small piece of land in Lokur, started farming and married a local girl. The couple had seven children and they formed the initial set of people who later bore other generations of children to become a gigantic family.

== Family structure ==
Tammanna who is aged around 90 years is the eldest male person in the family. The head of the family is Bhimanna who at 74 years old is the most educated person in his generation. Together there are around 70 men, 50 women and 60 children in the family. The family follows a rule that all family members must eat lunch and dinner together since they feel that people who eat together, stay together. They consume 50 kg of maize, 20 kg wheat flour and 40 litres of milk daily. The family is male-dominated with women having much less freedom. The menfolk in the family prefer less-educated girls with a view that girls with more education can bring disharmony among them. Several marriages are performed collectively after which the couples settle down in and around the ancestral home. The annual budget of the family is about 1.2 million rupees while a further 300 thousand rupees is spent on clothing, medicines and agriculture. The family grows all the vegetables and grains needed for its consumption in the 270 acres (1.1 km^{2}) of farming land that it owns. Other prominent members in the family include Padmanna who supervises agricultural activities, Mahaveer who looks after the supply of materials to the kitchen, Dharanendra who looks after the dairy and Devendra who maintains the vehicles the family owns and the borewells. The women in the family mostly work in the kitchen, tend to the children and look after the cleanliness in the house. The girls in the family are married off after they complete their secondary education.

== Recognition ==
In 1992, the Hindi film director, Ketan Mehta completed a documentary film titled All in the Family on the Narasinganavars. In 2007, a photo exhibition portraying different facets of the family was organised by the photographer K. Venkatesh at the Chitrakala Parishat in Bangalore.
