= Arga, Karnataka =

Arga
- village
- Country: India
- State: Karnataka
- District: Uttara Kannada

Government
  - Type: Panchayat raj
  - Body: Gram panchayat

Languages
  - Official: Kannada
- Time zone: UTC+5:30 (IST)
- ISO 3166 code: IN-KA
- Vehicle registration: KA-
- Website: karnataka.gov.in

Arga is a village in Uttara Kannada District, Karnataka, India. It lies south of Goa and borders the Arabian Sea.

In 2009 floods caused the villagers to leave their homes and seek shelter near the INS Kadamba naval base.

== See also ==
- INS Kadamba
