= Kerwad =

Kerwad may refer to:

- Kerwad (H), a village in Karnataka, India
- Kerwad (Gundyanati), a village in Karnataka, India
