= Anjali Nimbalkar =

Indian politician (born 1976)

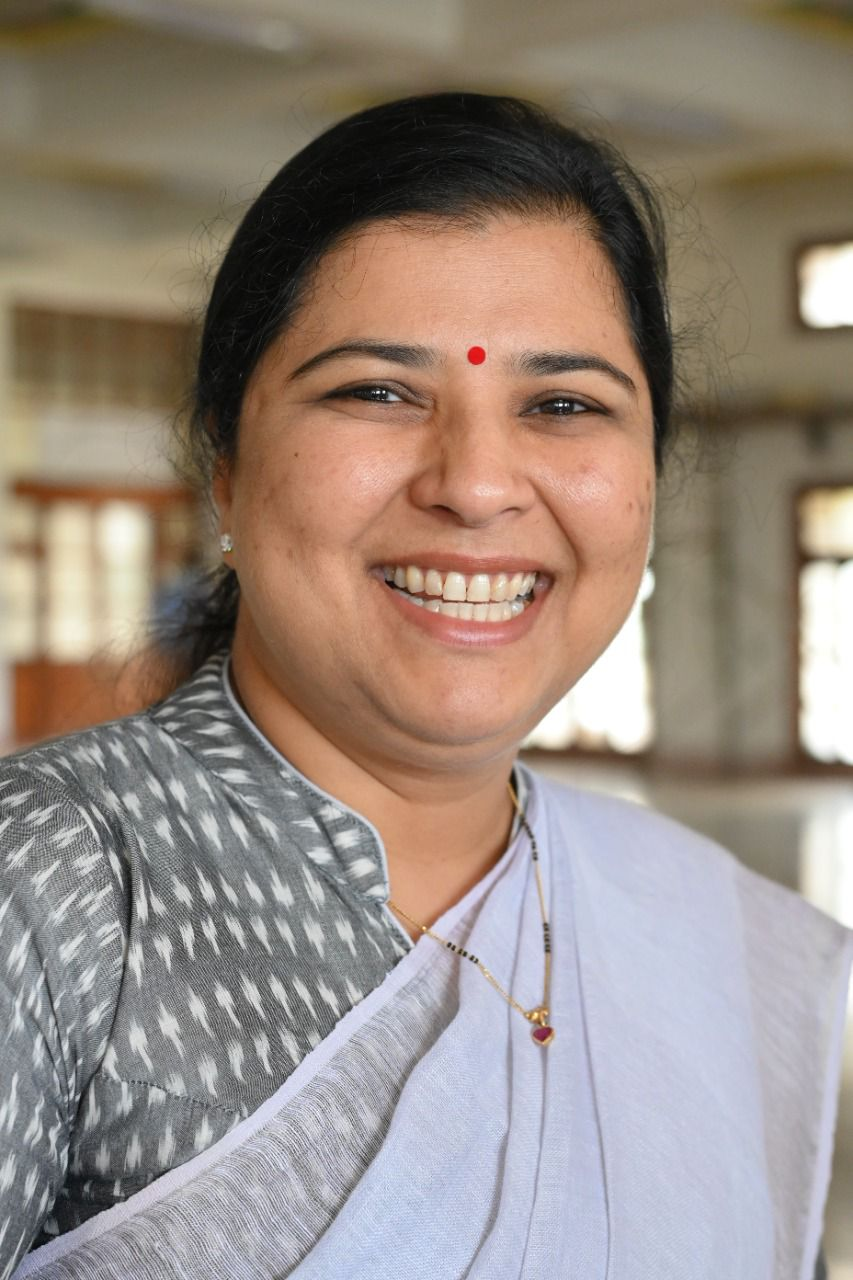

Member of Legislative Assembly
- In office 2018–2023
- Constituency: Khanapur
- Preceded by: Arvind Chandrakant Patil
- Succeeded by: Vithal Somanna Halagekar

Personal details
- Born: 22 August 1976 (age 50) Khanapur, Karnataka, India
- Party: Indian National Congress
- Spouse: Hemant Nimbalkar
- Relations: Ashok Shankarrao Chavan
- Children: 2
- Education: DY Patil School of Medicine, Navi Mumbai; Lokmanya Tilak Municipal Medical College, Mumbai
- Profession: Physician; Politician

Anjali Nimbalkar (born 22 August 1976) is an Indian physician and politician. She is a senior leader and spokesperson of the Indian National Congress. She represented Khanapur constituency at the Karnataka Legislative Assembly from 2018 to 2023. She was one of the ten doctors elected to make it to the 2018 Karnataka Legislative Assembly.

== Personal life ==
Anjali Nimbalkar was born on 22 August 1976 into a Hindu family in Khanapur, Karnataka. She holds a MBBS degree from Lokmanya Tilak Municipal Medical College, Mumbai obtained in 1998 and a Master of Surgery in Obstetrics and gynaecology from DY Patil School of Medicine, Navi Mumbai in 2010.

She is married to Hemant Nimbalkar, an officer with the Indian Police Service.

During a Goa–New Delhi flight on 15 December 2025, Anjali administered CPR to an American passenger who suffered a mid-air medical emergency, after she fainted and lost her pulse, helping to stabilise her condition. Following the incident, Anjali was commended by Karnataka Chief Minister Siddaramaiah.

== Political career ==
In 2018, Anjali Nimbalkar contested the election from Khanapur in the Karnataka Legislative Assembly election and won against Vithal Halagekar of the Bharatiya Janata Party (BJP). She secured a total of 36,649 votes, defeating Halagekar by a margin of 5,133 votes. Nimbalkar protested the salary hike under the Karnataka Ministers Salaries and Allowances (Amendment) Bill, 2022, by the Government of Karnataka, and requested the government to spend the same money to provide better facilities to the citizens.

She organized a padyatra to highlight issues of poor and neglected communities from her constituency. In the 2023 Assembly election, she lost to Halagekar by a margin of more than 54,000 votes.

In the 2024 general election to the Lok Sabha, she contested the Uttara Kannada constituency as a candidate of the Indian National Congress. However, she was not successful in this election.

Election Contests of Anjali Nimbalkar
Year	Election	Constituency	Opponent	Result	Margin	Reference
2018	Karnataka Legislative Assembly	Khanapur	Vithal Halagekar (BJP)	Won	5,133 votes	
2023	Karnataka Legislative Assembly	Khanapur	Vithal Halagekar (BJP)	Lost	54,629 votes	
2024	Lok Sabha	Uttara Kannada	Vishweshwar Hegde Kageri (BJP)	Lost	3,37,428 votes	
