= Arvind Patil =

Indian politician

Arvind Chandrakant Patil
- ಅರವಿಂದ್ ಚಂದ್ರಕಾಂತ್ ಪಾಟೀಲ್
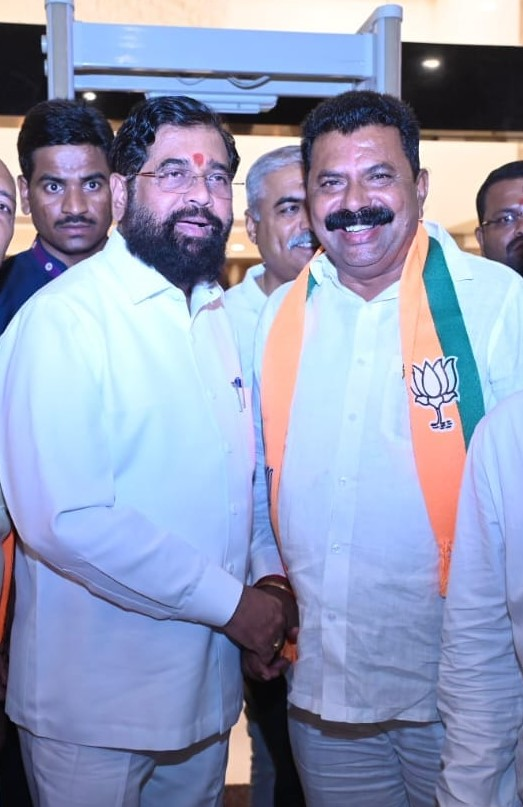
- Arvind Patil (Right) with Eknath Shinde

Member of the Legislative Assembly, Karnataka
- In office 2013–2018
- Preceded by: Pralhad Remani
- Succeeded by: Anjali Nimbalkar
- Constituency: Khanapur, Karnataka Assembly constituency

The Belagavi District Central Cooperative Bank
- Incumbent
- Assumed office 2005
- Designation: Term
- Director: 2005

Personal details
- Born: 17 March 1968 (age 58) Mouje Nandgad, Belagavi District
- Party: Bharatiya Janata Party
- Spouse: Sujata Patil
- Children: Rajvardhan Patil
- Parent: Late Chandrakant Patil (father)
- Occupation: Politician & Businessman

Arvind Chandrakant Patil (born 17 March 1968) is an Indian politician who served as a member of the Karnataka Legislative Assembly from the Khanapur constituency from 2013 to 2018. He is also an incumbent director of the Belgaum District Central Co-operative Bank (BDCC).

== Electoral performance ==
=== 2013 Karnataka Legislative Assembly election ===
| Elections | Constituency | Party | Result | Vote percentage | Opposition Candidate | Opposition Party | Opposition vote percentage |
|---|---|---|---|---|---|---|---|
| 2013 Karnataka Legislative Assembly election | Khanapur, Karnataka Assembly constituency | Independent politician | Won | 27.47% | Rafique Khatalsab Khanapuri | Indian National Congress | 15.5% |

=== 2018 Karnataka Legislative Assembly election ===
| Elections | Constituency | Party | Result | Vote percentage | Opposition Candidate | Opposition Party | Opposition vote percentage |
|---|---|---|---|---|---|---|---|
| 2018 Karnataka Legislative Assembly election | Khanapur, Karnataka Assembly constituency | Independent politician | Lost | 17.26% | Anjali Nimbalkar | Indian National Congress | 23.76% |

== Political career ==
In 2005, He was elected as the Director of The Belagavi District Central Cooperative Bank.

In 2013, He won the 14th Karnataka Assembly as Independent Candidate by defeating Rafique Khatalsab Khanapuri of Indian National Congress. He got a total of 37,055 votes while Rafique was at second with 20,903 votes.

In 2018, he was defeated by Anjali Nimbalkar of Indian National Congress. Anjali got a total of 36,649 votes while BJP candidate Vithal Halagekar was at second with 31,516 votes.

In 2020, With support from BJP, Arvind Patil defeated Anjali Nimbalkar of the Indian National Congress in The Belagavi District Central Cooperative Bank. Soon after the victory, District Minister Ramesh Jarkiholi and Deputy Chief Minister Laxman Savadi addressed the media, stating that Arvind would be entering Bharatiya Janata Party soon.

In 2021, He joined Bharatiya Janata Party in the presence of BJP Karnataka President and MP Nalin Kumar Kateel, Deputy Chief Minister of Karnataka Laxman Savadi, MLC Mahantesh Kavatagimath, Ex-MLA Sanjay Patil and BJP Karayakartas.

In 2023, With support of Arvind and Pramod (Chief Minister of Goa), Vithal Halagekar got elected to the 16th Karnataka Assembly from Khanapur, Karnataka Assembly constituency seat as an candidate of Bharatiya Janata Party by defeating Anjali Nimbalkar of Indian National Congress. Vithal Halagekar secured 91834 votes which is 57.04% of the total votes in Khanapur (Vidhana Sabha constituency) whereas Anjali secured 37205 votes which is 23.11% of the total votes. Vithal Halagekar won the election with a huge lead of 54629 votes.
