= Kerwad (H) =

Kerwad (H) Kerwad h
- Location in Karnataka, India Kerwad (H) (India)
- Coordinates: 15°21′10″N 74°46′20″E
- Country: India
- Region: South India
- State: Karnataka
- District: Uttara Kannada
- Taluka: Haliyal

Languages
  - Official: Kannada
- Time zone: UTC+5:30 (IST)
- Lok Sab constituency: Uttara Kannada
- Vidhan Sabha constituency: Haliyal
- Nearest town: Haliyal

Kerwad (H) is a village in Uttara Kannada in the southwestern India state of Karnataka. The village is 4 kilometres (2.5 mi) by road north of the town of Haliyal.

== History ==
Kerwad mango is very famous across the district, and the majority of mangoes sold in nearby markets like Haliyal, Dandeli, Dharwad, and Hubli come from there. There are a substantial number of Chardo families in this area, as they migrated due to the persecution by the Portuguese in Goa.

There is one of the famous deity God Siddappa around 3 KM from Kerwad towards East and the deity is situated below a big old tree.

== Language ==
Kannada is the most spoken language here along with Konkani. Konkani is spoken as it is close to Goa, and many Goans settled in Kerwad when they migrated from Goa.
