= Anantkumar Hegde =

Indian politician

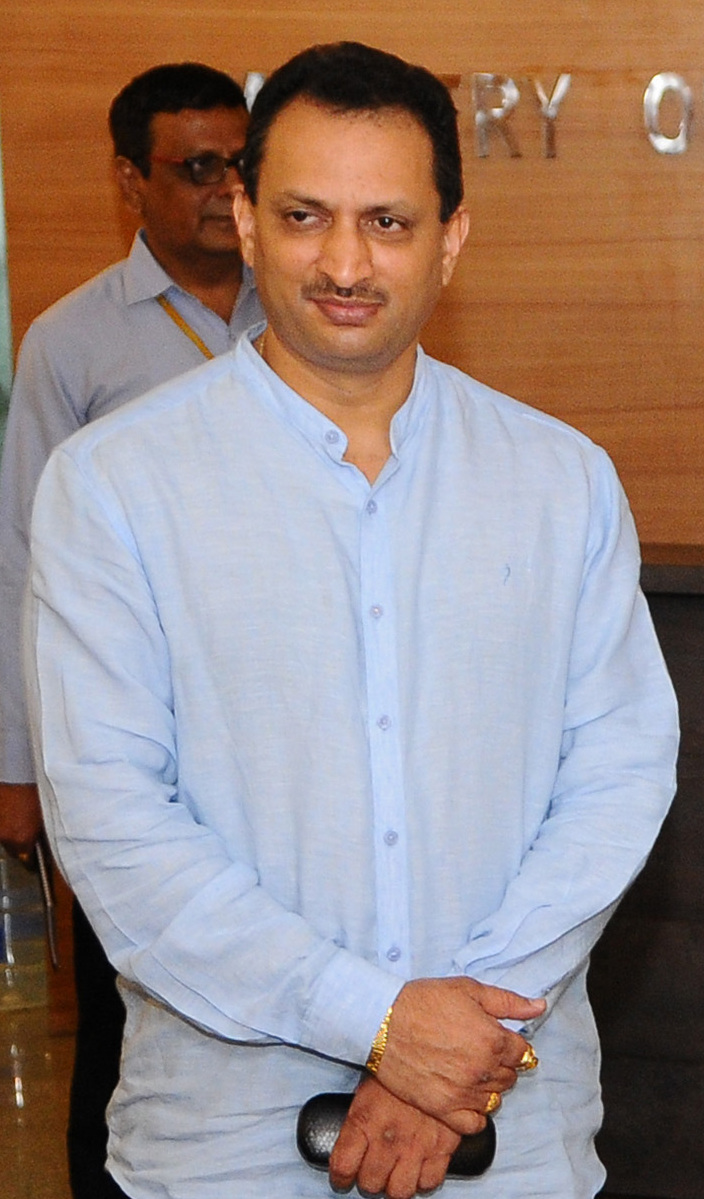

Minister of State for Skill Development Entrepreneurship
- In office 3 September 2017 – 24 May 2019
- Prime Minister: Narendra Modi
- Preceded by: Rajiv Pratap Rudy
- Constituency: Uttara Kannada

Member of Indian Parliament
- In office 2004–2024
- Preceded by: Margaret Alva
- Succeeded by: Vishweshwar Hegde Kageri
- Constituency: Uttara Kannada
- In office 1996–1999
- Preceded by: G. Devaraya Naik
- Succeeded by: Margaret Alva
- Constituency: Uttara Kannada

Personal details
- Born: 20 May 1968 (age 58) Sirsi, Uttara Kannada, Karnataka, India
- Party: Bharatiya Janata Party
- Children: 2
- Website: anantkumarhegde.com
- As of 23 September, 2006

Anantkumar Hegde (born 20 May 1968) is an Indian politician, the former Union Minister of State for Skill Development and Entrepreneurship and the former five time Member of Parliament for Uttara Kannada constituency. Hegde is a member of the Bharatiya Janata Party (BJP). Hegde is a Hindu nationalist and a Rashtriya Swayamsevak Sangh (RSS) volunteer.

== Early life ==
Hegde was born to Lalita and Dattatreya Hegde in Sirsi of Uttara Kannada district on 20 May 1968. He graduated from MM Arts & Science College in Sirsi. During college days he was member of Rashtriya Swayamsevak Sangh and later an ABVP activist. In 1998, Anant Kumar married Shrirupa Hegde and they have two children, a daughter and a son.

== Career ==
Six-time Lok Sabha member as of 2020, Hegde was first elected to the 11th Lok Sabha in 1996 from Uttara Kannada seat, then re-elected in 1998. He narrowly lost in the next election in 1999 to Margaret Alva of Congress. Since then, he has been re-elected four consecutive times from Uttara Kannada (Lok Sabha constituency) from 2004 to 2009 Lok Sabha to 2019–2024.

He was appointed the Union Minister of State for Skill Development and Entrepreneurship in Prime Minister Narendra Modi's cabinet since September 2017.

== Social activities ==
Hegde founded Kadamba group of organisations which works in the fields of multi-dimensional socioeconomic activities for the downtrodden, weaker and the vulnerable section of the society, particularly in the rural areas.

== Controversies ==
In January 2017, he was caught on camera assaulting and hitting a doctor for the alleged mistreatment of his mother at a hospital.

In 2018, speaking at a job fair and skill exhibition, he said that he will go ahead with his commitment of developing skills in the youth of India and not bother about the barking stray dogs, referring to groups protesting his earlier "change constitution" remark.

In 2018, he criticised the word secular and said that BJP government would "amend the Constitution" to remove the word from the Preamble.

He has claimed that Taj Mahal was originally a Shiv Mandir known as Tejo Mahalaya. After KPCC president Dinesh Gundu Rao questioned him over his achievements as a Union Minister, Hegde referred to Rao as "a guy who ran behind a Muslim lady".

In January 2019, he made a misogynistic comment against women entering the Sabarimala temple, which does not admit women, as a "daylight rape on Hindus".

In March 2019, he triggered controversy by calling the Congress president, Rahul Gandhi, a "hybrid product that can be found only in Congress laboratory". He said Gandhi claims to be a Brahmin "despite being born to a Muslim father and a Christian mother".

In September 2019, he once again triggered a controversy by calling the former IAS officer S. Sasikanth Senthil a traitor and asking him to go to Pakistan.

In February 2020, Hegde triggered another controversy by stating that the freedom fight led by Mahatma Gandhi was a drama. He attacked Gandhi by questioning how such a person be called a 'Mahatma'. He again stated that the freedom movement in India was staged with the consent and support of the British.

Lok Sabha
Preceded by G. Devaraya Naik	Member of Parliament for Uttara Kannada; 1996–1999	Succeeded by Margaret Alva
Preceded by Margaret Alva	Member of Parliament for Uttara Kannada; 2004 – present	Incumbent
