= Ankola Assembly constituency =

Former Assembly constituency in Karnataka, India

Coordinates: 14.67°N 74.30°E

Ankola
- Former constituency for the Karnataka Legislative Assembly

Constituency details
- Country: India
- Region: South India
- State: Karnataka
- District: Uttara Kannada
- Lok Sabha constituency: Uttara Kannada
- Established: 1955
- Abolished: 2008
- Reservation: None

Ankola Assembly constituency was a constituency of the Karnataka Legislative Assembly, which ceased to exist after 2008. It came under Uttara Kannada Lok Sabha constituency, Karnataka state, India.

== Members of the Legislative Assembly ==
Election	Member	Party
1952	Kadam Balso Purso	Samajwadi Party
1957	Kamat Ramchandra Gopal	Indian National Congress
1962	Shakar Pundlik Shet Phayde	Indian National Congress
1967	N. D. Sarveshwar	Praja Socialist Party
1972	R. K. Mahabaleshwar	Indian National Congress
1978	Anasuya Gajanan Sharma	Janata Party
1983	Hegde Shripad Ramakrishna	Indian National Congress
1985	Ajjibal. G. S. Hegde	Janata Party
1989	Umesh Bhat	Indian National Congress
1994	Vishweshwar Hegde Kageri	Bharatiya Janata Party
1999	Vishweshwar Hegde Kageri	Bharatiya Janata Party
2004	Vishweshwar Hegde Kageri	Bharatiya Janata Party

== Election results ==
=== Assembly Election 2004 ===
2004 Karnataka Legislative Assembly election : Ankola
Party	Candidate	Votes	%	±%
BJP	Vishweshwar Hegde Kageri	46,787	48.52%	▼2.09
INC	Shantaram Hegde Shigehalli	30,709	31.85%	▼8.71
JD(S)	Venkatesh Hegde Hosbale	12,428	12.89%	▲4.64
Kannada Nadu Party	Vasant Govind Nayak	2,760	2.86%	New
JP	Hegde Ganesh Ganapati	2,539	2.63%	New
Urs Samyuktha Paksha	Mere Rebello Urban	1,208	1.25%	New
Margin of victory		16,078	16.67%	▲6.62
Turnout		96,611	72.72%	▲1.91
Total valid votes		96,431		
Registered electors		132,845		▲9.99
BJP hold		Swing	▼2.09	

=== Assembly Election 1999 ===
1999 Karnataka Legislative Assembly election : Ankola
Party	Candidate	Votes	%	±%
BJP	Vishweshwar Hegde Kageri	41,500	50.61%	▲16.48
INC	Umesh Shankar Bhat	33,259	40.56%	▲25.05
JD(S)	Naik Ravindra Narayan	6,767	8.25%	New
Margin of victory		8,241	10.05%	▲4.50
Turnout		85,524	70.81%	▼2.56
Total valid votes		81,997		
Rejected ballots		3,525	4.12%	▲2.19
Registered electors		120,780		▲4.83
BJP hold		Swing	▲16.48	

=== Assembly Election 1994 ===
1994 Karnataka Legislative Assembly election : Ankola
Party	Candidate	Votes	%	±%
BJP	Vishweshwar Hegde Kageri	28,285	34.13%	▲18.38
JD	Pramod Hegde	23,683	28.58%	▼2.62
INC	Naik Narayan. M	17,643	21.29%	New
INC	Umesh Bhat	12,856	15.51%	▼21.31
Margin of victory		4,602	5.55%	▼0.07
Turnout		84,538	73.37%	▲4.38
Total valid votes		82,873		
Rejected ballots		1,635	1.93%	▼6.37
Registered electors		115,216		▲6.83
BJP gain from INC		Swing	▼2.69	

=== Assembly Election 1989 ===
1989 Karnataka Legislative Assembly election : Ankola
Party	Candidate	Votes	%	±%
INC	Umesh Bhat	25,122	36.82%	▼1.48
JD	Kamat Ramchandra Gopal	21,287	31.20%	New
BJP	Kadekodi Hegde Shankar	10,750	15.75%	▲9.76
Independent	Laxman Chudya Naik	7,459	10.93%	New
JP	Kenikar Garu Banu	3,523	5.16%	New
Margin of victory		3,835	5.62%	▼10.24
Turnout		74,409	68.99%	▲0.98
Total valid votes		68,236		
Rejected ballots		6,173	8.30%	▲6.67
Registered electors		107,847		▲24.59
INC gain from JP		Swing	▼17.34	

=== Assembly Election 1985 ===
1985 Karnataka Legislative Assembly election : Ankola
Party	Candidate	Votes	%	±%
JP	Ajjibal. G. S. Hegde	31,365	54.16%	▲26.08
INC	Hegde Ramakrishna Narayan	22,179	38.30%	▲4.18
BJP	Kadekodi Hegde Ganapati Shankar	3,470	5.99%	▼7.83
Independent	Naik Balkrishna Venkanna	371	0.64%	New
Independent	Keremanelaxmidhar Honnappa	363	0.63%	New
Margin of victory		9,186	15.86%	▲9.82
Turnout		58,872	68.01%	▲3.83
Total valid votes		57,910		
Rejected ballots		962	1.63%	▼0.97
Registered electors		86,562		▲12.73
JP gain from INC		Swing	▲20.04	

=== Assembly Election 1983 ===
1983 Karnataka Legislative Assembly election : Ankola
Party	Candidate	Votes	%	±%
INC	Hegde Shripad Ramakrishna	16,379	34.12%	▲25.80
JP	Anasuya Gajanan Sharma Kallal	13,479	28.08%	▼27.52
Independent	Gouda Buddu Keera	11,514	23.98%	New
BJP	Suresh Naik Honnappa	6,636	13.82%	New
Margin of victory		2,900	6.04%	▼13.49
Turnout		49,287	64.18%	▼7.61
Total valid votes		48,008		
Rejected ballots		1,279	2.60%	▲0.26
Registered electors		76,790		▲7.31
INC gain from JP		Swing	▼21.48	

=== Assembly Election 1978 ===
1978 Karnataka Legislative Assembly election : Ankola
Party	Candidate	Votes	%	±%
JP	Anasuya Gajanan Sharma	27,897	55.60%	New
INC(I)	Naik Ramachandra Vasudev	18,100	36.08%	New
INC	Shripad. R. Hegde Kadve	4,173	8.32%	▼33.48
Margin of victory		9,797	19.53%	▲3.17
Turnout		51,371	71.79%	▲14.67
Total valid votes		50,170		
Rejected ballots		1,201	2.34%	▲2.34
Registered electors		71,559		▲16.43
JP gain from INC		Swing	▲13.80	

=== Assembly Election 1972 ===
1972 Mysore State Legislative Assembly election : Ankola
Party	Candidate	Votes	%	±%
INC	R. K. Mahabaleshwar	14,241	41.80%	▲14.59
INC(O)	V. K. Ramakant Narvekar	8,667	25.44%	New
ABJS	S. V. Jathar	5,843	17.15%	New
SSP	Shankar Keni	3,226	9.47%	New
Independent	R. G. Naik	2,090	6.13%	New
Margin of victory		5,574	16.36%	▼2.82
Turnout		35,105	57.12%	▼3.75
Total valid votes		34,067		
Registered electors		61,460		▲11.13
INC gain from PSP		Swing	▼4.59	

=== Assembly Election 1967 ===
1967 Mysore State Legislative Assembly election : Ankola
Party	Candidate	Votes	%	±%
PSP	N. D. Sarveshwar	14,352	46.39%	▲19.13
INC	A. G. Venkatesh	8,418	27.21%	▼34.47
Independent	N. R. Gopala	6,323	20.44%	New
Independent	P. S. Venkatrao	1,843	5.96%	New
Margin of victory		5,934	19.18%	▼15.24
Turnout		33,666	60.87%	▲8.94
Total valid votes		30,936		
Registered electors		55,307		▼16.02
PSP gain from INC		Swing	▼15.29	

=== Assembly Election 1962 ===
1962 Mysore State Legislative Assembly election : Ankola
Party	Candidate	Votes	%	±%
INC	Shakar Pundlik Shet Phayde	19,235	61.68%	▲7.60
PSP	Narashimha Tammayya Hebbar	8,502	27.26%	▼3.99
CPI	Gopinath Vithoba Pawar	2,997	9.61%	New
Independent	Pokka Devu Gouda	450	1.44%	New
Margin of victory		10,733	34.42%	▲11.58
Turnout		34,200	51.93%	▼1.52
Total valid votes		31,184		
Registered electors		65,856		▲13.88
INC hold		Swing	▲7.60	

=== Assembly Election 1957 ===
1957 Mysore State Legislative Assembly election : Ankola
Party	Candidate	Votes	%	±%
INC	Kamat Ramchandra Gopal	16,715	54.08%	▲27.43
PSP	Gunaga Shiva Bommu	9,657	31.25%	New
Independent	Balgi Vasudev Venkatraman	4,534	14.67%	New
Margin of victory		7,058	22.84%	▲15.28
Turnout		30,906	53.45%	▼1.84
Total valid votes		30,906		
Registered electors		57,827		▲15.70
INC gain from SP		Swing	▲19.87	

=== Assembly Election 1952 ===
1952 Bombay State Legislative Assembly election : Ankola Karwar
Party	Candidate	Votes	%	±%
SP	Kadam Balso Purso	9,454	34.21%	New
INC	Gaonkar Sannappa Parmeshwar	7,364	26.65%	New
CPI	Padti Chudo Fakir	2,577	9.33%	New
Independent	Nadkarni Yeshwant Trimbak	1,794	6.49%	New
Independent	Kamat. M. R	1,769	6.40%	New
Independent	Revankar Laxman Krishna	1,734	6.28%	New
Independent	Aigal Venkatesh Devappa	1,612	5.83%	New
MFB	Mazumdar Shankarrao Mahableshwarrao	725	2.62%	New
Independent	Swar Ramchandra Dattatraya	604	2.19%	New
Margin of victory		2,090	7.56%	
Turnout		27,633	55.29%	
Total valid votes		27,633		
Registered electors		49,979		
SP win (new seat)				
