= Vithal Somanna Halagekar =

Indian politician

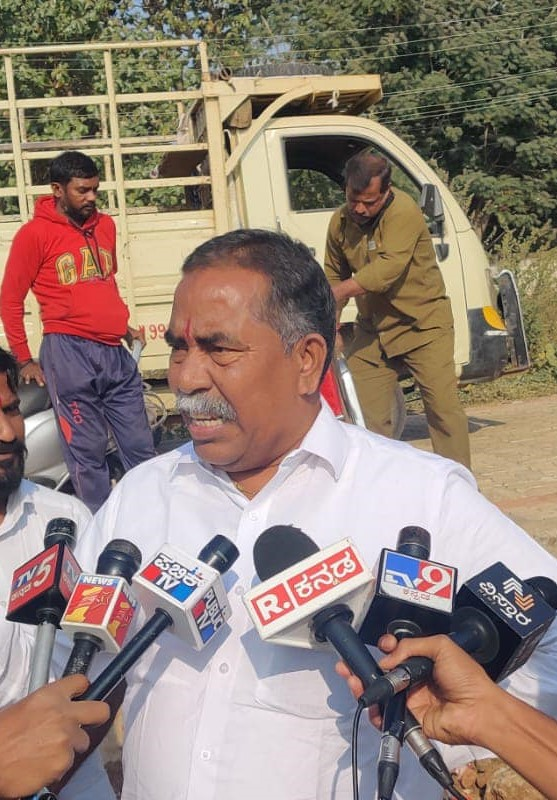

Member of the Karnataka Legislative Assembly
- Incumbent
- Assumed office 13 May 2023
- Preceded by: Anjali Nimbalkar
- Constituency: Khanapur, Karnataka Assembly constituency

Personal details
- Born: 7 January 1963 (age 63) Topinkatti, Belagavi District
- Party: Bharatiya Janata Party
- Parent: Somanna Halagekar (father)
- Education: Rani Channamma University, Belagavi
- Occupation: Politician & Chairman

Vithal Somanna Halagekar (born 7 January 1963) is an Indian politician and a member of the Karnataka Legislative Assembly from the Khanapur constituency. He is affiliated with the Bharatiya Janata Party (BJP). Halagekar has been a prominent political figure in Karnataka, known for his electoral victories and contributions to his constituency.

In the 2018 Karnataka Legislative Assembly election, Halagekar contested from the Khanapur constituency but was defeated by Anjali Nimbalkar of the Indian National Congress (INC). However, he made a significant comeback in the 2023 Karnataka Legislative Assembly election, where he won the Khanapur seat by a margin of 54,629 votes, defeating the incumbent MLA Anjali Nimbalkar.

== Early life ==
Halagekar was born on 7 January 1963 in Khanapur, Belagavi district, Karnataka. He completed his Bachelor of Science (B.Sc.) degree from GSS College, Belagavi, in 1986-87 and later obtained a Bachelor of Education (B.Ed.) degree from Sangolli Rayanna College, Belagavi, in 1987-88. Halagekar has been involved in agriculture and service sectors throughout his career. He is also the managing director of Shri Mahalaxmi Group, Khanapur, and Shree Bhagyalaxmi Sugar Factory, Khanapur.
