= Sharada Mohan Shetty =

Indian politician (born 1962)

Sharada Mohan Shetty (born 1962) is an Indian politician from Karnataka. She was elected as a Member of the Legislative Assembly in 2013 from Kumta Assembly constituency in Uttara Kannada district, representing the Indian National Congress.

Sharada is from Sirsi, Uttara Kannada district, Karnataka. She did her schooling at Sirsi and passed Class 12. She married Mohan Shetty.

== Career ==
Sharada became an MLA for the first time winning the 2013 Karnataka Legislative Assembly election from Kumta Assembly constituency representing the Indian National Congress. She polled 36,756 votes and defeated her nearest rival, Dinakar Keshav Shetty of the Janata Dal (Secular), by a margin of 420 votes. She polled 26,642 but lost the next election from the same constituency as Keshav Shetty won on BJP ticket and defeated Sharada Shetty, the Congress candidate, by a margin of 32,750 votes. In 2018, she was denied a ticket by the Congress and she joined the BJP. In 2023, she filed nomination as an independent candidate but later withdrew in favour of the Congress candidate. She rejoined Congress in April 2024.
