= Dinakar =

Dinakar is a given name. Notable people with the name include:

- Dinakar Keshav Shetty (born 1957), Indian politician
- Dinakar Thoogudeepa (born 1978), Indian director, actor, and producer
