= Bhimanna T. Naik =

Indian politician

Bhimanna Tirkappa Naik (born 1959) is an Indian politician from Karnataka. He is an MLA from Sirsi Assembly constituency in Uttara Kannada district. He won the 2023 Karnataka Legislative Assembly election representing Indian National Congress.

== Early life and education ==
Naik is from Sirsi. His father Tirkappa Naik is a farmer. He passed Class 5 and discontinued his studies while in Class 7 at Higher Primary School, Bisalakoppa, Sirsi, in 1985.

== Career ==
Naik won from Sirsi Assembly constituency representing Indian National Congress in the 2023 Karnataka Legislative Assembly election. He polled 76,887 votes and defeated his nearest rival, Vishweshwar Hegde Kageri of Bharatiya Janata Party, by a margin of 8,712 votes. Earlier, he lost the 2018 Karnataka Legislative Assembly election losing to Bharatiya Janata Party's Kageri Vishweshwar Hegde, by a margin of 17,461 votes.
