= Joachim Alva =

Indian lawyer, journalist, and politician

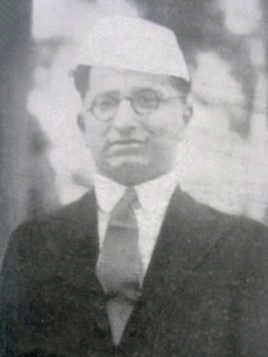
- Joachim Alva, c. 1938

Sheriff of Bombay
- In office 1949–1950
- Preceded by: Mahadeo Laxman Dahanukar
- Succeeded by: Sir Fazal Ibrahim Rahimtoola

Member of Parliament, Rajya Sabha
- In office 3 April 1968 – 2 April 1974
- Constituency: Nominated

Member of Parliament, Lok Sabha
- In office 1952–1967
- Constituency: Kanara (Lok Sabha constituency)

Personal details
- Born: 21 January 1907
- Died: 28 June 1979 (aged 72)
- Spouse: Violet Alva (m. 1937; died 1969)
- Relations: Margaret Alva (Daughter-in-law)

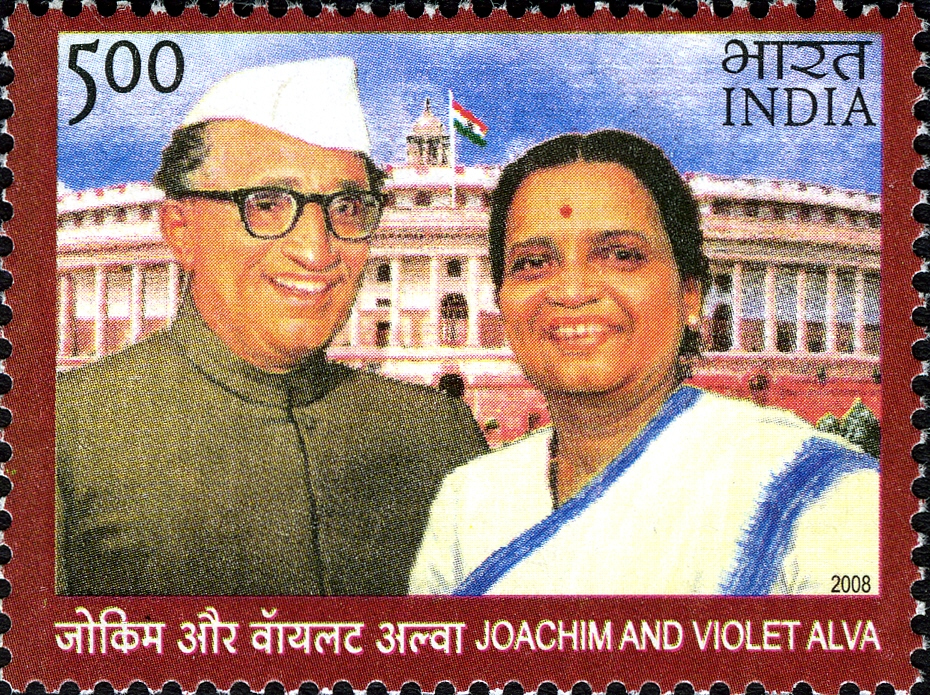
Joachim and Violet Alva on a 2008 stamp of India

Joachim Ignatius Sebastian Alva (21 January 1907 – 28 June 1979) was an Indian lawyer, journalist and politician from Mangalore. He was a prominent Mangalorean Christian figure involved in the Indian independence movement.

After Independence, Alva was appointed Sheriff of Bombay in 1949 for the Bombay state. In 1950, he entered the Provisional Parliament of India. He was elected to the Lok Sabha in 1952, 1957, and 1962 from North Kanara. He was nominated to the Rajya Sabha in 1968 and retired from the Rajya Sabha in 1974.

== History ==
Joachim Alva belonged to the Alva-Bhat, a Mangalorean Catholic clan from Belle in Udupi district. He was educated at the Jesuit St. Aloysius College, Mangalore, Elphinstone College, Government Law College, Mumbai and the Jesuit St. Xavier's College, Mumbai.

In 1928, Alva became the first Christian to be elected as Secretary of the fifty-year-old Bombay Students' Brotherhood. Along with Khurshed Nariman, H.D. Raja, Yusuf Meherally and Soli Batliwala, he was a pioneer of the Bombay Youth League.

In 1930, Alva founded the Nationalist Christian Party with the goal of drawing the Christian community into the freedom struggle. He borrowed and earned money to pay his way through college. He was expelled from St. Xavier's College, Mumbai for moving a resolution at the Catholic Students Union urging it to throw open its doors to non-Catholic students. In 1937, Alva presided over a large meeting of Christians at Bombay addressed by Jawaharlal Nehru. He was actively involved in organizing the "No-Tax" campaign at the Bardoli Satyagraha, the boycotting of the Simon Commission and appointed President of the Bombay Congress "War Council".

Imprisoned twice by British Indian authorities on charges of sedition for a total of three years, Alva was jail companion to Vallabhbhai Patel, Jayaprakash Narayan, Morarji Desai and J. C. Kumarappa. In 1934, Mahatma Gandhi wrote a letter to Alva to inform him that he had missed him at Yerwada Jail because of his early release.

In 1941, in Nasik prison, Alva wrote two books: Men and Supermen of Hindustan and Indian Christians and Nationalism. Although the manuscripts of both were confiscated by prison authorities, Men and Supermen of Hindustan was subsequently re-drafted and published in 1943.

In 1937, Alva married Violet Hari, a Gujarati Protestant from Ahmedabad and professor of English at St. Xavier's Indian Women's University College. Violet would also go on to become active in national politics.

On 9 August 1943, the first anniversary of Quit India Day, Joachim and Violet Alva founded and debuted FORUM, a weekly news magazine which became known for its championing of the cause of independence.

FORUM blazed a trail in Indian journalism, marking the beginning of a trend of political weekly news magazines. Alva's office was often raided for seditious material. In spite of the sweeping powers of the British Raj, he penned a historic editorial "Halt This March To the Gallows".

After Independence, Alva was appointed Sheriff of Bombay in 1949 and entered the Provisional Parliament of India in 1950. He was elected to the Lok Sabha from North Kanara in the first three General Elections in 1952, 1957 and 1962.

An early advocate of planning, the public sector, nationalised banking and state control over major industries, he condemned France's napalm bombing of Indo-China and staunchly supported the Vietnamese cause. In 1962, Alva led on India's attempts for closer ties with China, meeting Mao Zedong and Zhou Enlai in Beijing.

In 1952, Violet was elected to the Rajya Sabha making her and Joachim the first couple to be elected to Parliament under adult franchise.

The Government of India issued a stamp commemorating the couple in November 2008.

== Personal life ==
Joachim and Violet Alva had two sons, Niranjan and Chittaranjan, and a daughter, Maya.

The couple were close associates of Khin Kyi, Burma's ambassador to India from 1960, widow of Burmese nationalist General Aung San.

His son Niranjan is married to Margaret Alva, née Margaret Nazareth who was served as former General Secretary of the All India Congress Committee, former Governor of Uttarakhand, Rajasthan, Gujarat and Goa.
