= Sirsi Assembly constituency =

Legislative Assembly constituency in Karnataka State, India

Coordinates: 14.62°N 74.84°E

Sirsi
- Constituency No. 80 for the Karnataka Legislative Assembly

Constituency details
- Country: India
- Region: South India
- State: Karnataka
- District: Uttara Kannada
- Lok Sabha constituency: Uttara Kannada
- Established: 1956
- Total electors: 200,755
- Reservation: None

Member of Legislative Assembly
- 16th Karnataka Legislative Assembly
- Incumbent Bhimanna Naik
- Party: Indian National Congress
- Elected year: 2023
- Preceded by: Vishweshwar Hegde Kageri

Sirsi Assembly constituency is one of the 224 Legislative Assembly constituencies of Karnataka in India.

It is part of Uttara Kannada district. Bhimanna T. Naik is the current MLA from Sirisi.

== Members of the Legislative Assembly ==
Election	Member	Party
1957	Ramakrishna Hegde	Indian National Congress
1962	Ramakrishna Hegde	Indian National Congress
1967	M. H. Jayaprakashanarayan	Praja Socialist Party
1972	M. H. Jayaprakashanarayan	Indian National Congress
1978	Borkar Umakant Buddu	Janata Party
1983	Kanade Gopal Mukund	Janata Party
1985	Kanade Gopal Mukund	Indian National Congress
1989	Kanade Gopal Mukund	Indian National Congress
1994	Jaiwani Premanand Subray	Janata Dal
1999	Viveknand Vaidya	Bharatiya Janata Party
2004	Viveknand Vaidya	Bharatiya Janata Party
2008	Vishweshwar Hegde Kageri	Bharatiya Janata Party
2013	Vishweshwar Hegde Kageri	Bharatiya Janata Party
2018	Vishweshwar Hegde Kageri	Bharatiya Janata Party
2023	Bhimanna T. Naik	Indian National Congress

== Election results ==
=== Assembly Election 2023 ===
2023 Karnataka Legislative Assembly election : Sirsi
Party	Candidate	Votes	%	±%
INC	Bhimanna T. Naik	76,887	47.89	▲13.63
BJP	Vishweshwar Hegde Kageri	68,175	42.47	▼3.05
JD(S)	Upendra Pai	9,138	5.69	▼11.48
NOTA	None of the above	1,638	1.02	▼0.23
AAP	Hitendra Naik	1,449	0.90	New
Independent	Gopal Devadiga	1,266	0.79	New
Margin of victory		8,712	5.43	▼5.83
Turnout		160,920	80.16	▼1.20
Total valid votes		160,538		
Registered electors		200,755		▲5.20
INC gain from BJP		Swing	▲2.37	

=== Assembly Election 2018 ===
2018 Karnataka Legislative Assembly election : Sirsi
Party	Candidate	Votes	%	±%
BJP	Vishweshwar Hegde Kageri	70,595	45.52	▲10.03
INC	Bhimanna T. Naik	53,134	34.26	▲1.30
JD(S)	Shashibhushan Hegde	26,625	17.17	▼15.76
NOTA	None of the above	1,935	1.25	New
Independent	Ajjibal Ramanand	981	0.63	New
Margin of victory		17,461	11.26	▲8.73
Turnout		155,271	81.36	▲6.02
Total valid votes		155,079		
Registered electors		190,834		▲9.51
BJP hold		Swing	▲10.03	

=== Assembly Election 2013 ===
2013 Karnataka Legislative Assembly election : Sirsi
Party	Candidate	Votes	%	±%
BJP	Vishweshwar Hegde Kageri	42,854	35.49	▼9.91
INC	Ayyappanagar Deepak Honnavar	39,795	32.96	▲13.67
JD(S)	Shashibhushan Hegde	39,761	32.93	▲27.52
KJP	Huvinamane Ravi Hegde	3,304	2.74	New
Independent	Annappa Akash. S. Madival	2,246	1.86	New
BSP	Sudhakar Kira Joglekar	1,374	1.14	▲0.04
BSRCP	Nagaraj Venkatraman Hegde	1,061	0.88	New
JD(U)	Kanade Santosh Gopal	796	0.66	New
Margin of victory		3,059	2.53	▼23.58
Turnout		131,285	75.34	▲1.54
Total valid votes		120,745		
Registered electors		174,259		▲9.19
BJP hold		Swing	▼9.91	

=== Assembly Election 2008 ===
2008 Karnataka Legislative Assembly election : Sirsi
Party	Candidate	Votes	%	±%
BJP	Vishweshwar Hegde Kageri	53,438	45.40	▲2.55
INC	Naik Raveendranath Narayan	22,705	19.29	▼10.87
SP	Bheemanna Naik	18,648	15.84	New
Independent	Gowda Shanmukh Basavaraj	12,116	10.29	New
JD(S)	Narvekar Nagaraj Gurunath	6,363	5.41	▼16.44
Independent	Anand H. Gowda	2,318	1.97	New
BSP	Ramanatha Hegde	1,292	1.10	New
LJP	Kanade Ramadas Venkappa	822	0.70	New
Margin of victory		30,733	26.11	▲13.42
Turnout		117,776	73.80	▼0.11
Total valid votes		117,702		
Registered electors		159,589		▲5.62
BJP hold		Swing	▲2.55	

=== Assembly Election 2004 ===
2004 Karnataka Legislative Assembly election : Sirsi
Party	Candidate	Votes	%	±%
BJP	Viveknand Vaidya	47,811	42.85	▼1.52
INC	Jaiwant Premanand	33,652	30.16	▼1.24
JD(S)	Kanade Gopal Mukund	24,378	21.85	▲21.12
JP	Jogalekar Ganapathi Bangari	4,003	3.59	New
Kannada Nadu Party	Gajanan Krishna Palekar	1,735	1.55	New
Margin of victory		14,159	12.69	▼0.28
Turnout		111,679	73.91	▲0.05
Total valid votes		111,579		
Registered electors		151,101		▲9.36
BJP hold		Swing	▼1.52	

=== Assembly Election 1999 ===
1999 Karnataka Legislative Assembly election : Sirsi
Party	Candidate	Votes	%	±%
BJP	Viveknand Vaidya	42,813	44.37	▲18.35
INC	Kanade Gopal Mukund	30,301	31.40	▲5.90
Independent	P. S. Jaiwant	21,679	22.47	New
Independent	B. Chandrappa	992	1.03	New
JD(S)	Joglekar Vishwanath Bangarya	704	0.73	New
Margin of victory		12,512	12.97	▲11.11
Turnout		102,059	73.86	▲0.31
Total valid votes		96,489		
Rejected ballots		5,568	5.46	▲3.76
Registered electors		138,174		▲4.09
BJP gain from JD		Swing	▲16.49	

=== Assembly Election 1994 ===
1994 Karnataka Legislative Assembly election : Sirsi
Party	Candidate	Votes	%	±%
JD	Jaiwani Premanand Subray	26,758	27.88	▼9.82
BJP	Viveknand Vaidya	24,972	26.02	▲18.27
INC	Kanade Gopal Mukund	24,470	25.50	▼23.84
INC	Mohan Shiroor	18,788	19.58	New
Margin of victory		1,786	1.86	▼9.79
Turnout		97,629	73.55	▲2.66
Total valid votes		95,962		
Rejected ballots		1,663	1.70	▼6.37
Registered electors		132,739		▲5.87
JD gain from INC		Swing	▼21.46	

=== Assembly Election 1989 ===
1989 Karnataka Legislative Assembly election : Sirsi
Party	Candidate	Votes	%	±%
INC	Kanade Gopal Mukund	40,319	49.34	▲3.09
JD	Sirasikara Mahabaleswara Venkappa	30,801	37.70	New
BJP	Vyadya Vivekananda Subrava	6,331	7.75	▼0.67
JP	Patanakara Srinivasa Pandu	3,325	4.07	New
Margin of victory		9,518	11.65	▲9.57
Turnout		88,886	70.89	▲0.22
Total valid votes		81,710		
Rejected ballots		7,176	8.07	▲6.43
Registered electors		125,378		▲24.36
INC hold		Swing	▲3.09	

=== Assembly Election 1985 ===
1985 Karnataka Legislative Assembly election : Sirsi
Party	Candidate	Votes	%	±%
INC	Kanade Gopal Mukund	32,414	46.25	▲14.36
JP	Jaiwani Premanand Subray	30,955	44.17	▲3.75
BJP	Krishna Venkatraman Bharkal	5,901	8.42	▼19.27
Independent	Gutya Naga Jogiekar	486	0.69	New
Margin of victory		1,459	2.08	▼6.45
Turnout		71,250	70.67	▲2.10
Total valid votes		70,085		
Rejected ballots		1,165	1.64	▼1.05
Registered electors		100,819		▲15.51
INC gain from JP		Swing	▲5.83	

=== Assembly Election 1983 ===
1983 Karnataka Legislative Assembly election : Sirsi
Party	Candidate	Votes	%	±%
JP	Kanade Gopal Mukund	23,540	40.42	▼10.28
INC	Revankar Shankar Purushottam	18,575	31.89	▲28.93
BJP	Bhatkal Krishna Venkatraman	16,125	27.69	New
Margin of victory		4,965	8.53	▲4.16
Turnout		59,852	68.57	▼11.09
Total valid votes		58,240		
Rejected ballots		1,612	2.69	▲0.15
Registered electors		87,283		▲9.05
JP hold		Swing	▼10.28	

=== Assembly Election 1978 ===
1978 Karnataka Legislative Assembly election : Sirsi
Party	Candidate	Votes	%	±%
JP	Borkar Umakant Buddu	31,506	50.70	New
INC(I)	Revankar Shankar Purushottam	28,793	46.33	New
INC	Jogannavar Yallappa Venkappa	1,842	2.96	▼63.24
Margin of victory		2,713	4.37	▼28.03
Turnout		63,762	79.66	▲19.78
Total valid votes		62,141		
Rejected ballots		1,621	2.54	▲2.54
Registered electors		80,040		▲25.75
JP gain from INC		Swing	▼15.50	

=== Assembly Election 1972 ===
1972 Mysore State Legislative Assembly election : Sirsi
Party	Candidate	Votes	%	±%
INC	M. H. Jayaprakashanarayan	24,373	66.20	▲29.71
ABJS	Borkar Umakant Buddu	12,444	33.80	▲9.44
Margin of victory		11,929	32.40	▲29.74
Turnout		38,113	59.88	▼1.67
Total valid votes		36,817		
Registered electors		63,649		▲20.60
INC gain from PSP		Swing	▲27.05	

=== Assembly Election 1967 ===
1967 Mysore State Legislative Assembly election : Sirsi
Party	Candidate	Votes	%	±%
PSP	M. H. Jayaprakashanarayan	11,282	39.15	▲13.80
INC	R. S. Purushottam	10,516	36.49	▼16.84
ABJS	B. U. Buddu	7,019	24.36	New
Margin of victory		766	2.66	▼25.32
Turnout		32,487	61.55	▼9.73
Total valid votes		28,817		
Registered electors		52,778		▼5.45
PSP gain from INC		Swing	▼14.18	

=== Assembly Election 1962 ===
1962 Mysore State Legislative Assembly election : Sirsi
Party	Candidate	Votes	%	±%
INC	Ramakrishna Hegde	19,817	53.33	▼19.31
PSP	H. Ganapatiyappa	9,421	25.35	▲1.66
SWA	Anant Manjappa Hegde Hoodlamane	7,117	19.15	New
ABJS	Sitaram Subraya Kanetkar	804	2.16	New
Margin of victory		10,396	27.98	▼20.97
Turnout		39,790	71.28	▲6.17
Total valid votes		37,159		
Registered electors		55,823		▲20.15
INC hold		Swing	▼19.31	

=== Assembly Election 1957 ===
1957 Mysore State Legislative Assembly election : Sirsi
Party	Candidate	Votes	%	±%
INC	Ramakrishna Hegde	21,974	72.64	New
PSP	Dhakappa Shriram Sheshgiri	7,166	23.69	New
Independent	Nejjur Shanmukh Sadashiv	1,110	3.67	New
Margin of victory		14,808	48.95	
Turnout		30,250	65.11	
Total valid votes		30,250		
Registered electors		46,461		
INC win (new seat)				

== See also ==
- List of constituencies of the Karnataka Legislative Assembly
- Uttara Kannada district
