= Margaret Alva =

Indian politician (born 1942)

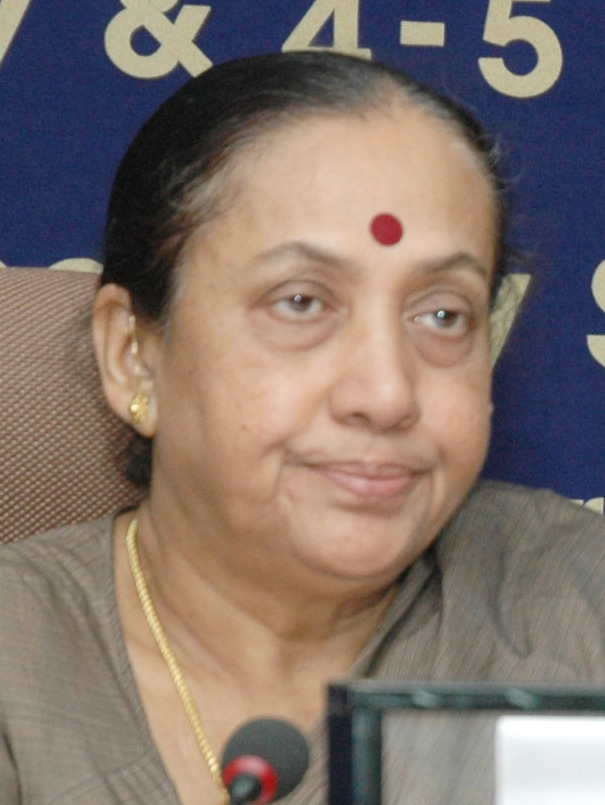
- Alva in 2006

17th Governor of Goa
- In office 12 July 2014 – 5 August 2014
- Chief Minister: Manohar Parrikar
- Preceded by: Bharat Vir Wanchoo
- Succeeded by: Om Prakash Kohli

23rd Governor of Gujarat
- In office 7 July 2014 – 15 July 2014
- Chief Minister: Anandiben Patel
- Preceded by: Kamla Beniwal
- Succeeded by: Om Prakash Kohli

19th Governor of Rajasthan
- In office 12 May 2012 – 5 August 2014
- Chief Minister: Ashok Gehlot; Vasundhara Raje
- Preceded by: Shivraj Patil
- Succeeded by: Ram Naik (Additional Charge)

4th Governor of Uttarakhand
- In office 12 August 2011 – 14 May 2012
- Chief Minister: Ramesh Pokhriyal; B. C. Khanduri; Vijay Bahuguna
- Preceded by: Banwari Lal Joshi
- Succeeded by: Aziz Qureshi
- In office 6 August 2009 – 3 July 2011
- Chief Minister: Ramesh Pokhriyal
- Preceded by: Banwari Lal Joshi
- Succeeded by: Banwari Lal Joshi

Member of Parliament, Lok Sabha
- In office 6 October 1999 — 16 May 2004
- Preceded by: Anant Kumar Hegde
- Succeeded by: Anant Kumar Hegde
- Constituency: Kanara

Minister of State for Personnel, Public Grievances and Pensions
- In office 26 June 1991 – 26 May 1996

Minister of State for Youth Affairs and Sports
- In office 26 May 1985 – 26 May 1989
- Prime Minister: Rajiv Gandhi

Minister of State, Parliamentary Affairs
- In office 25 July 1984 – 25 July 1985
- Prime Minister: Indira Gandhi; Rajiv Gandhi
- In office 25 July 1993 – 25 July 1996
- Prime Minister: P. V. Narasimha Rao

Member of Parliament, Rajya Sabha
- In office 25 July 1974–25 July 1998
- Constituency: Karnataka

Personal details
- Born: Margaret Nazareth; 14 April 1942 (age 84) Mangalore, Madras Presidency, British India (present-day Mangaluru, Karnataka, India)
- Party: Indian National Congress
- Spouse: Niranjan Alva (m. 1964; died 2018)
- Relations: Violet Alva (mother-in-law); Joachim Alva (father-in-law); Anuja Chauhan (daughter-in-law)
- Children: 4, including Niret Alva
- Education: Mount Carmel College (B.A.), University Law College, Bangalore (LL.B.)
- Profession: Lawyer

Margaret Nazareth Alva (born 14 April 1942) is an Indian lawyer and politician who served as the 17th Governor of Goa, 23rd Governor of Gujarat, 19th Governor of Rajasthan and 4th Governor of Uttarakhand at various times between 2009 and 2014. She has formerly served as the Cabinet Minister. She took over in Rajasthan from the Punjab governor, Shivraj Patil, who had been holding an additional charge of that state. Before being appointed governor, she was a senior figure in the Indian National Congress and was Joint Secretary of the All India Congress Committee. Her mother-in-law, Violet Alva, was Second Deputy Chairperson of the Rajya Sabha in 1960s.

On 17 July 2022, the United Progressive Alliance along with some other non-UPA opposition parties nominated her for the post of Vice President of India in the 2022 election. But she was defeated by her opponent Jagdeep Dhankhar by a margin of 346 votes on 6 August 2022.

== Early life ==
Margaret Nazareth Alva was born Margaret de Nazareth on 14 April 1942, to a Mangalorean Catholic family at Mangalore, in Karnataka. She obtained a BA degree from Mount Carmel College, Bangalore and a law degree from Government Law College in the same city. She was a keen and appreciated debater during her time at college and had some involvement in students' movements.

Alva combined her work as an advocate with involvement in welfare organisations, eventually becoming president of the Young Women's Christian Association. One of her early involvements was with the Karuna non-governmental organisation, which she founded and which was focused on issues relating to women and children.

On 24 May 1964 she married Niranjan Thomas Alva, whom she had met while they were both students at Government Law College. The couple had one daughter and three sons, the oldest being Niret Alva. Niranjan Alva ran a successful export business, which gave his wife a financial security that proved beneficial in her later career.

== Politics ==
=== Beginnings ===
Alva's decision to enter politics in 1969 was influenced by her husband's parents, Joachim Alva and Violet Alva, both of whom had served Members of Parliament representing the Indian National Congress. She has acknowledged this encouragement, saying that "I never had to face any family constraints on my political activities" and she has also said that the death of Violet in 1969 provided the impetus. She aligned herself with the Congress (Indira) faction led by Indira Gandhi and worked for its state unit in Karnataka. She served as Joint Secretary of the All India Congress Committee between 1975 and 1977 and as General Secretary of the Karnataka Pradesh Congress Committee between 1978 and 1980.

=== Rajya Sabha ===
In April 1974, Alva was elected to the Rajya Sabha as a representative of Congress. She served a six-year term and was then re-elected for three more six-year terms, in 1980, 1986, and 1992. During her time in the Rajya Sabha, she was its vice-chairman (1983–85) and also served terms as Union Minister of State in the ministries for Parliamentary Affairs (1984–85) and for Youth and Sports and Women and Child Development, an arm of the Ministry of Human Resource Development. She also served on various House committees, which garnered her a considerable degree of procedural expertise, and was briefly Minister for Science and Technology.

In her HRD role, between 1985 and 1989, Alva oversaw the Rajiv Gandhi-led government's 28-point plan intended to improve the rights and involvement of women and children. In addition, she made proposals for various development corporations for women, only some of which materialised, and also campaigned for a greater prominence of women in government and in her party's official posts. Her 1989 proposal that 33 per cent of seats in panchayat raj (local government) elections should be reserved for women became law in 1993 and, according to Laura Jenkins, "marked a further shift from the former abhorrence of reservations as a nationally divisive policy". She continued her efforts to improve the lot of women during her period as Minister of State for Personnel, Public Grievances, Pensions and Parliamentary Affairs (1991 and 1993-96), where she tried to increase the number of female officeholders in various ministries and government organisations, such as the Union Public Service Commission and the judiciary.

Alva has also been involved with women's issues and related matters such as population growth on the international stage, notably through various United Nations bodies and in writings.

=== Lok Sabha ===
Alva was elected to the 13th Lok Sabha as a Member of Parliament in 1999 for the Uttara Kannada constituency, serving a five-year term. She lost a subsequent re-election attempt in the 2004. Between 2004 and 2009, she served as General Secretary of the All India Congress Committee and was an advisor to the Bureau of Parliamentary Studies & Training, a government body that works with newly elected parliamentary representatives at both national and state level.

=== Governorships ===
In November 2008, Alva said that Congress seats for the elections in Karnataka were open to bidders rather than subject to meritocratic appointment. Congress denied her claims and a meeting with the party president, Sonia Gandhi resulted in Alva resigning or being removed from her numerous official responsibilities in the party. Subsequently, Alva patched up her differences with Congress leadership. She has declined to go into details of the 2008 controversy even as her resignation letter continues to be a subject of media speculation.

On 6 August 2009, Alva became the first female Governor of Uttarakhand. Although she said then that she was enthusiastic about the challenges facing the nascent state, she found herself sidelined outside national politics and frustrated by the Bharatiya Janata Party state government. She remained in the post until May 2012, at which time she was appointed Governor of Rajasthan, which was a more important region in political terms. Of her time in Uttarakhand, Alva said that "The quietude allowed me to recharge my batteries and even spare some time for working on my biography". The autobiography is not expected to appear until after her retirement.

The move to Rajasthan relieved Shivraj Patil, the Governor of Punjab, of his temporary adjunct responsibility for that state which had arisen due to the death of the incumbent governor, Prabha Rau, in April 2010; on 7 August 2014 she was dismissed by the President of India on the advice of the Narendra Modi ministry.

== Electoral performance ==
Results of the Indian vice-presidential election, 2022
Candidate	Party (Coalition)	Electoral Votes	% of Votes
Jagdeep Dhankhar	BJP (NDA)	528	74.37
Margaret Alva	INC (UO)	182	25.63
Total		710	100
Valid Votes		710	
Invalid Votes		15	
Turnout		725	92.95%
Abstentions		55	7.05%
Electors		780	

=== Rajya Sabha ===
Position	Party	Constituency	From	To	Tenure
Member of Parliament, Rajya Sabha (1st Term)	INC	Karnataka	3 April 1974	2 April 1980	5 years, 365 days
Member of Parliament, Rajya Sabha (2nd Term)	INC	Karnataka	3 April 1980	2 April 1986	5 years, 364 days
Member of Parliament, Rajya Sabha (3rd Term)	INC	Karnataka	3 April 1986	2 April 1992	5 years, 365 days
Member of Parliament, Rajya Sabha (4th Term)	INC	Karnataka	3 April 1992	2 April 1998	5 years, 364 days
