= Khanapur, Karnataka Assembly constituency =

Legislative Assembly constituency in Karnataka, India

Coordinates: 15.64°N 74.51°E

Khanapur
- Constituency No. 14 for the Karnataka Legislative Assembly

Constituency details
- Country: India
- Region: South India
- State: Karnataka
- District: Belagavi
- Lok Sabha constituency: Uttara Kannada
- Established: 1956
- Total electors: Total : 2,12,664; Males : 1,09,732; Females : 1,02,922; Others : 10
- Reservation: None

Member of Legislative Assembly
- 16th Karnataka Legislative Assembly
- Incumbent Vithal Somanna Halagekar
- Party: Bharatiya Janata Party
- Elected year: 2023
- Preceded by: Anjali Nimbalkar

Khanapur Assembly constituency is one of the 224 assembly constituencies in the state of Karnataka in India. It is one of the eight constituencies which make up Uttara Kannada Lok Sabha constituency. It has been a stronghold of Maharashtra Ekikaran Samiti (MES) whose candidates tend to contest as independents because it is not officially recognized as a party. In 1962, MES contested the election under its own official name.

== Members of the Legislative Assembly ==
Election	Member	Party
1952	Aragavi Basappa Shiddalingappa	Indian National Congress
1957	Laxman Balaji Birje	Independent politician
1962	Laxman Balaji Birje	Maharashtra Ekikaran Samiti
1967	Sirdesai Nilkanthrao Bhagvantrao	Independent politician
1972	Sirdesai Nilkanthrao Bhagvantrao	Independent politician
1978	Sirdesai Nilkanthrao Bhagvantrao	Independent politician
1983	Vasantrao Parashram Patil	Independent politician
1985	Vasantrao Parashram Patil	Independent politician
1989	Chavan Bithalrao Vithalrao	Independent politician
1994	Ashok Narayan Patil	Independent politician
1999	Ashok Narayan Patil	Independent politician
2004	Digambar Yashawantarao Patil	Independent politician
2008	Pralhad Remani	Bharatiya Janata Party
2013	Arvind Patil	Independent politician
2018	Dr. Anjali Nimbalkar	Indian National Congress
2023	Vithal Somanna Halagekar	Bharatiya Janata Party

== Election results ==
=== Assembly Election 2023 ===
2023 Karnataka Legislative Assembly election : Khanapur
Party	Candidate	Votes	%	±%
BJP	Vithal Somanna Halagekar	91,834	57.04%	▲36.60
INC	Dr. Anjali Hemant Nimbalkar	37,205	23.11%	▼0.65
JD(S)	Bagawan Nasir Papulsab	15,600	9.69%	▼7.99
Independent	Muralidhar Ganapati Patil	9,671	6.01%	New
Independent	Sitaram Maruti Sutar	1,382	0.86%	New
NOTA	None of the above	1,236	0.77%	▼0.24
Shivsena (Uddhav Balasaheb Thackeray)	Krishnaji Pundalik Patil	983	0.61%	New
Margin of victory		54,629	33.93%	▲30.60
Turnout		161,043	75.09%	▲0.39
Total valid votes		161,013		
Registered electors		214,456		▲3.81
BJP gain from INC		Swing	▲33.28	

=== Assembly Election 2018 ===
2018 Karnataka Legislative Assembly election : Khanapur
Party	Candidate	Votes	%	±%
INC	Dr. Anjali Nimbalkar	36,649	23.76%	▲8.26
BJP	Vithal Halagekar	31,516	20.44%	▲8.56
JD(S)	Bagawan Nasir Papulsab	27,272	17.68%	▲6.52
Independent	Arvind Patil	26,613	17.26%	New
Independent	Vilas Krishna Belgaonkar	17,851	11.58%	New
Independent	Jothiba Pralhad Remani	5,898	3.82%	New
Independent	Krishnaji Pundalik Patil	2,153	1.40%	New
NOTA	None of the above	1,561	1.01%	New
Indian New Congress Party	Yashavanth Thimanna Nippanikar	1,326	0.86%	New
Margin of victory		5,133	3.33%	▼8.64
Turnout		154,322	74.70%	▲1.94
Total valid votes		154,219		
Registered electors		206,576		▲11.43
INC gain from Independent		Swing	▼3.71	

=== Assembly Election 2013 ===
2013 Karnataka Legislative Assembly election : Khanapur
Party	Candidate	Votes	%	±%
Independent	Arvind Patil	37,055	27.47%	New
INC	Rafique Khatalsab Khanapuri	20,903	15.50%	▼6.02
Independent	Dr. Anjali Nimbalkar	17,686	13.11%	New
BJP	Pralhad Kallappa Remani	16,021	11.88%	▼19.83
JD(S)	Bagawan Nasir Papulsab	15,052	11.16%	▲8.73
KJP	Baburao Govind Desai	14,502	10.75%	New
Independent	Vithal Somanna Halagekar	3,087	2.29%	New
Independent	Patil Rajgopal Irappa	2,401	1.78%	New
Independent	Suresh Vittalrao Desai	1,988	1.47%	New
Margin of victory		16,152	11.97%	▲1.79
Turnout		134,896	72.76%	▲2.44
Total valid votes		134,890		
Registered electors		185,386		▲13.85
Independent gain from BJP		Swing	▼4.24	

=== Assembly Election 2008 ===
2008 Karnataka Legislative Assembly election : Khanapur
Party	Candidate	Votes	%	±%
BJP	Pralhad Remani	36,288	31.71%	New
INC	Rafique Khatalsab Khanapuri	24,634	21.52%	▲3.62
Independent	Digambar Yashawantarao Patil	9,684	8.46%	New
Independent	Komal Padmappa Jinagond	6,773	5.92%	New
Independent	Arvind Patil	6,020	5.26%	New
Independent	Mahadev P. Maragale	4,424	3.87%	New
Independent	D. M. Gurav	3,054	2.67%	New
Independent	Mugutsab Kasimsab Dharwadi	2,878	2.51%	New
JD(S)	Bagawan Nasir Papulsab	2,776	2.43%	▼1.61
Margin of victory		11,654	10.18%	▲9.83
Turnout		114,511	70.32%	▲2.09
Total valid votes		114,450		
Registered electors		162,839		▲6.15
BJP gain from Independent		Swing	▲13.45	

=== Assembly Election 2004 ===
2004 Karnataka Legislative Assembly election : Khanapur
Party	Candidate	Votes	%	±%
Independent	Digambar Yashawantarao Patil	19,115	18.26%	New
Independent	Patil Vaishali Ashok	18,747	17.91%	New
INC	Rafique Khatalsab Khanapuri	18,734	17.90%	▼3.09
JD(U)	Pralhad Kallappa Remani	17,495	16.72%	New
SS	Muralidhar Ganapati Patil	13,317	12.72%	New
JP	Riyaz Ahmad Abdulkarim Patil	4,440	4.24%	New
JD(S)	Mallikarjun Wali	4,233	4.04%	New
Kannada Nadu Party	Raju Babu Rao Kusoji	2,133	2.04%	New
Independent	Ramesh Shantavali Narvekar	2,125	2.03%	New
Margin of victory		368	0.35%	▼17.67
Turnout		104,659	68.23%	▼3.63
Total valid votes		104,656		
Registered electors		153,398		▲10.00
Independent hold		Swing	▼22.04	

=== Assembly Election 1999 ===
1999 Karnataka Legislative Assembly election : Khanapur
Party	Candidate	Votes	%	±%
Independent	Ashok Narayan Patil	36,930	40.30%	New
Independent	Desai Narayan Yeshwantrao	20,419	22.28%	New
INC	Channabasappa Balappa Hosamani	19,238	20.99%	▲12.06
BJP	Pralhad Kallappa Remani	15,049	16.42%	▲4.37
Margin of victory		16,511	18.02%	▼13.92
Turnout		100,206	71.86%	▲1.96
Total valid votes		91,636		
Rejected ballots		8,570	8.55%	▲6.10
Registered electors		139,451		▲10.00
Independent hold		Swing	▼6.70	

=== Assembly Election 1994 ===
1994 Karnataka Legislative Assembly election : Khanapur
Party	Candidate	Votes	%	±%
Independent	Ashok Narayan Patil	40,619	47.00%	New
KRRS	Wali Mallikarjun. B	13,010	15.05%	New
BJP	Jayant Vasudev Pitre	10,411	12.05%	New
JD	Riyaj Ahmad. A. Patil	9,347	10.81%	▼0.19
INC	Amboji Chandrashekhar. B	7,722	8.93%	▼7.15
INC	Kabbur Shantinath. B	2,527	2.92%	New
Independent	Appaji Gopal Patil	1,197	1.38%	New
Margin of victory		27,609	31.94%	▲11.50
Turnout		88,613	69.90%	▲3.93
Total valid votes		86,428		
Rejected ballots		2,174	2.45%	▼3.82
Registered electors		126,775		▲6.18
Independent hold		Swing	▲1.41	

=== Assembly Election 1989 ===
1989 Karnataka Legislative Assembly election : Khanapur
Party	Candidate	Votes	%	±%
Independent	Chavan Bithalrao Vithalrao	33,662	45.59%	New
Kranti Sabha	Appaji Gopal Patil	18,571	25.15%	New
INC	Alavani Subanna Huvappa	11,873	16.08%	▼10.39
JD	Riyaz Ahmad Abdulkarim Patil	8,121	11.00%	New
Independent	Tirveer Vasant Ramana	964	1.31%	New
Margin of victory		15,091	20.44%	▼6.91
Turnout		78,765	65.97%	▲2.43
Total valid votes		73,830		
Rejected ballots		4,935	6.27%	▲4.24
Registered electors		119,400		▲27.82
Independent hold		Swing	▼8.23	

=== Assembly Election 1985 ===
1985 Karnataka Legislative Assembly election : Khanapur
Party	Candidate	Votes	%	±%
Independent	Vasantrao Parashram Patil	31,298	53.82%	New
INC	Kalal Ramachandra Narasappa	15,393	26.47%	▲1.45
Independent	Sonoli Dundappa Appojappa	7,815	13.44%	New
Independent	Dattaji Kallappa Patil	2,617	4.50%	New
Independent	Amrut Irappa Ravut	521	0.90%	New
Independent	Patil Basangouda Rudragouda	512	0.88%	New
Margin of victory		15,905	27.35%	▼9.24
Turnout		59,358	63.54%	▼11.39
Total valid votes		58,156		
Rejected ballots		1,202	2.03%	▼0.64
Registered electors		93,414		▲3.28
Independent hold		Swing	▼7.78	

=== Assembly Election 1983 ===
1983 Karnataka Legislative Assembly election : Khanapur
Party	Candidate	Votes	%	±%
Independent	Vasantrao Parashram Patil	40,633	61.60%	New
INC	Ambadagatti Masnu Fakirappa	16,501	25.02%	New
JP	Babshet Krishnaji Ramachandra	8,826	13.38%	▼11.07
Margin of victory		24,132	36.59%	▲31.17
Turnout		67,770	74.93%	▲2.92
Total valid votes		65,960		
Rejected ballots		1,810	2.67%	▼0.72
Registered electors		90,449		▲13.15
Independent hold		Swing	▲31.73	

=== Assembly Election 1978 ===
1978 Karnataka Legislative Assembly election : Khanapur
Party	Candidate	Votes	%	±%
Independent	Sirdesai Nilkanthrao Bhagawantrao	16,610	29.87%	New
JP	Babshet Krishnaji Ramachandra	13,595	24.45%	New
INC(I)	Ambadagatti Masnu Fakirappa	12,439	22.37%	New
Independent	Dattaji Kallappa Patil	12,436	22.36%	New
Independent	Patil Gopal Laxman	533	0.96%	New
Margin of victory		3,015	5.42%	▼24.42
Turnout		57,567	72.01%	▲7.98
Total valid votes		55,613		
Rejected ballots		1,954	3.39%	▲3.39
Registered electors		79,938		▲18.79
Independent hold		Swing	▼25.63	

=== Assembly Election 1972 ===
1972 Mysore State Legislative Assembly election : Khanapur
Party	Candidate	Votes	%	±%
Independent	S. N. Bhagvantrao	23,081	55.50%	New
INC(O)	B. B. Veerabhadrappa	10,674	25.67%	New
INC	P. Sulochanan W/o Shripad	7,829	18.83%	▼14.04
Margin of victory		12,407	29.84%	▲14.44
Turnout		43,091	64.03%	▼11.77
Total valid votes		41,584		
Registered electors		67,293		▲9.17
Independent hold		Swing	▲7.23	

=== Assembly Election 1967 ===
1967 Mysore State Legislative Assembly election : Khanapur
Party	Candidate	Votes	%	±%
Independent	S. N. Bhagvantrao	21,281	48.27%	New
INC	T. K. Ningappa	14,490	32.87%	▼3.87
Independent	M. S. Martandrao	8,313	18.86%	New
Margin of victory		6,791	15.40%	▼11.12
Turnout		46,725	75.80%	▲6.57
Total valid votes		44,084		
Registered electors		61,640		▲2.38
Independent gain from MES		Swing	▼14.99	

=== Assembly Election 1962 ===
1962 Mysore State Legislative Assembly election : Khanapur
Party	Candidate	Votes	%	±%
MES	Laxman Balaji Birje	25,162	63.26%	New
INC	Rohinibai Pandurang Wagale	14,614	36.74%	▲4.05
Margin of victory		10,548	26.52%	▼8.10
Turnout		41,682	69.23%	▲7.07
Total valid votes		39,776		
Registered electors		60,208		▼4.58
MES gain from Independent		Swing	▼4.05	

=== Assembly Election 1957 ===
1957 Mysore State Legislative Assembly election : Khanapur
Party	Candidate	Votes	%	±%
Independent	Laxman Balaji Birje	26,401	67.31%	New
INC	Aragavi Basappa Shiddalingappa	12,822	32.69%	▼12.12
Margin of victory		13,579	34.62%	▲31.17
Turnout		39,223	62.16%	▼13.46
Total valid votes		39,223		
Registered electors		63,100		▲17.07
Independent gain from INC		Swing	▲22.50	

=== Assembly Election 1952 ===
1952 Bombay State Legislative Assembly election : Khanapur
Party	Candidate	Votes	%	±%
INC	Aragavi Basappa Shiddalingappa	18,264	44.81%	New
PWPI	Laxman Balaji Birje	16,856	41.36%	New
KMPP	Yamkanmardi Gadigeppa Golappa	3,433	8.42%	New
CPI	Patil Mallappa Gopal	2,204	5.41%	New
Margin of victory		1,408	3.45%	
Turnout		40,757	75.62%	
Total valid votes		40,757		
Registered electors		53,899		
INC win (new seat)				

== See also ==
- Belagavi district
- List of constituencies of Karnataka Legislative Assembly
