= Kumta Assembly constituency =

Legislative Assembly constituency in Karnataka State, India

Coordinates: 14.43°N 74.42°E

Kumta
- Constituency No. 78 for the Karnataka Legislative Assembly

Constituency details
- Country: India
- Region: South India
- State: Karnataka
- District: Uttara Kannada
- Lok Sabha constituency: Uttara Kannada
- Established: 1956
- Total electors: 188,894
- Reservation: None

Member of Legislative Assembly
- 16th Karnataka Legislative Assembly
- Incumbent Dinakar Keshav Shetty
- Party: Bharatiya Janata Party
- Elected year: 2023
- Preceded by: Sharada Mohan Shetty

Kumta Assembly constituency is one of the 224 Legislative Assembly constituencies of Karnataka in India.

It is part of Uttara Kannada district. Dinakar Keshav Shetty is the current MLA from Kumta.

== Members of the Legislative Assembly ==
Election	Member	Party
1952	Ramkrishna Biranna Naik	Indian National Congress
1957	Vasantlata. V. Mirjankar	Indian National Congress
1962	Vasantlata. V. Mirjankar	Indian National Congress
1967	H. R. Manjanath	Independent politician
1972	Sitaram Vasudev Naik	Indian National Congress
1978	Sitaram Vasudev Naik	Indian National Congress
1983	Karki. M. P	Bharatiya Janata Party
1985	N. H. Gouda	Janata Party
1989	Krishna Hanuma Gouda	Indian National Congress
1994	Karki. M. P	Bharatiya Janata Party
1999	Mohan Krishna Shetty	Indian National Congress
2004	Mohan Krishna Shetty	Indian National Congress
2008	Dinakar Keshav Shetty	Janata Dal
2013	Sharada Mohan Shetty	Indian National Congress
2018	Dinakar Keshav Shetty	Bharatiya Janata Party
2023	Dinakar Keshav Shetty	Bharatiya Janata Party

== Election results ==
=== Assembly Election 2023 ===
2023 Karnataka Legislative Assembly election : Kumta
Party	Candidate	Votes	%	±%
BJP	Dinakar Keshav Shetty	59,965	40.37%	▼0.26
JD(S)	Suraj Naik Soni	59,289	39.92%	▲28.59
INC	Alva Nivedith	19,270	12.97%	▼5.26
Independent	Ishwar Gouda	3,588	2.42%	New
NOTA	None of the above	2,085	1.40%	▼0.10
AAP	Roopa Gajanan Naik	1,960	1.32%	New
Margin of victory		676	0.46%	▼21.94
Turnout		148,849	78.80%	▼2.40
Total valid votes		148,530		
Registered electors		188,894		▲4.71
BJP hold		Swing	▼0.26	

=== Assembly Election 2018 ===
2018 Karnataka Legislative Assembly election : Kumta
Party	Candidate	Votes	%	±%
BJP	Dinakar Keshav Shetty	59,392	40.63%	▲19.51
INC	Sharada Mohan Shetty	26,642	18.23%	▼9.09
Independent	Suraj Naik Soni	20,474	14.01%	New
JD(S)	Nayak Pradeep Dayanand	16,561	11.33%	▼15.68
Independent	Yashodhar. G. Naik	11,512	7.88%	New
Independent	Krishna Jatti Gouda	5,089	3.48%	New
NOTA	None of the above	2,192	1.50%	New
Indian New Congress Party	Mohan Baglu Patgar	1,274	0.87%	New
AIMEP	Nagraj. N. Naik	984	0.67%	New
Margin of victory		32,750	22.40%	▲22.09
Turnout		146,474	81.20%	▲7.03
Total valid votes		146,177		
Registered electors		180,394		▲7.62
BJP gain from INC		Swing	▲13.31	

=== Assembly Election 2013 ===
2013 Karnataka Legislative Assembly election : Kumta
Party	Candidate	Votes	%	±%
INC	Sharada Mohan Shetty	36,756	27.32%	▼1.42
JD(S)	Dinakar Keshav Shetty	36,336	27.01%	▼1.75
BJP	Suraj Naik Soni	28,411	21.12%	▼7.09
KJP	Gouda Gayatri Manjunath	14,286	10.62%	New
Independent	Mohan Baglu Patgar	3,070	2.28%	New
HND	Nagaraj Shridhar Shet	1,534	1.14%	New
BSP	Vasant Jogalekar	978	0.73%	▼0.97
Independent	Mahabaleshwar Ramakrishna Bhat Madguni	881	0.65%	New
Margin of victory		420	0.31%	▲0.29
Turnout		124,331	74.17%	▲5.09
Total valid votes		134,517		
Registered electors		167,621		▲7.93
INC gain from JD(S)		Swing	▼1.44	

=== Assembly Election 2008 ===
2008 Karnataka Legislative Assembly election : Kumta
Party	Candidate	Votes	%	±%
JD(S)	Dinakar Keshav Shetty	30,792	28.76%	▲0.76
INC	Mohan Krishna Shetty	30,772	28.74%	▼5.04
BJP	Shashibhushan Hegde	30,201	28.21%	▼2.20
SP	Ganesh Ganapathi Hegde	8,624	8.05%	New
Independent	Shet Savitri Shridhar	2,854	2.67%	New
BSP	G. Nathakumar Gowda	1,819	1.70%	New
Rashtriya Hindustan Sena Karnataka	Tippayya Nagappa Naik	1,011	0.94%	New
Independent	Bhandari Sadanand Annappa	992	0.93%	New
Margin of victory		20	0.02%	▼3.35
Turnout		107,294	69.08%	▼0.44
Total valid votes		107,065		
Registered electors		155,309		▲5.01
JD(S) gain from INC		Swing	▼5.02	

=== Assembly Election 2004 ===
2004 Karnataka Legislative Assembly election : Kumta
Party	Candidate	Votes	%	±%
INC	Mohan Krishna Shetty	34,738	33.78%	▼17.42
BJP	Shashibhushan Hegde	31,273	30.41%	▼6.81
JD(S)	Dinakar K. Shetty	28,796	28.00%	▲16.98
JP	Ganesh Shet	3,296	3.21%	New
Independent	Timmanna Devanna Hegde	1,600	1.56%	New
Kannada Nadu Party	Hegde Venkataraman Vasudev	1,222	1.19%	New
Independent	Dr. Karki. M. P	729	0.71%	New
Independent	Ashok Jadugar	630	0.61%	New
Margin of victory		3,465	3.37%	▼10.61
Turnout		102,827	69.52%	▲2.40
Total valid votes		102,826		
Registered electors		147,900		▲6.84
INC hold		Swing	▼17.42	

=== Assembly Election 1999 ===
1999 Karnataka Legislative Assembly election : Kumta
Party	Candidate	Votes	%	±%
INC	Mohan Krishna Shetty	45,315	51.20%	▲36.05
BJP	Dr. Karki. M. P	32,940	37.22%	▲3.16
JD(S)	Gouda Nagesh Kuppa	9,752	11.02%	New
Margin of victory		12,375	13.98%	▲9.06
Turnout		92,912	67.12%	▼2.19
Total valid votes		88,501		
Rejected ballots		4,403	4.74%	▲2.31
Registered electors		138,435		▲8.51
INC gain from BJP		Swing	▲17.14	

=== Assembly Election 1994 ===
1994 Karnataka Legislative Assembly election : Kumta
Party	Candidate	Votes	%	±%
BJP	Karki. M. P	29,379	34.06%	▲17.93
JD	Dinakar Keshav Shetty	25,136	29.14%	▼1.55
INC	Krishna Hanuma Gouda	15,853	18.38%	New
INC	Upparkar Ibrahim Eusen	13,071	15.15%	▼28.71
Independent	Hegde Timmanna Narayan	962	1.12%	New
Margin of victory		4,243	4.92%	▼8.25
Turnout		88,422	69.31%	▲0.45
Total valid votes		86,266		
Rejected ballots		2,145	2.43%	▼5.06
Registered electors		127,582		▲3.16
BJP gain from INC		Swing	▼9.80	

=== Assembly Election 1989 ===
1989 Karnataka Legislative Assembly election : Kumta
Party	Candidate	Votes	%	±%
INC	Krishna Hanuma Gouda	34,556	43.86%	▲8.83
JD	Kamalakar Gokaran	24,182	30.69%	New
BJP	Karki. M. P	12,710	16.13%	▲6.39
JP	N. H. Gouda	4,615	5.86%	New
Independent	Pai. N. V	1,268	1.61%	New
Independent	Yakub Saheb. A. Shaikh	1,107	1.41%	New
Margin of victory		10,374	13.17%	▲0.44
Turnout		85,167	68.86%	▲2.18
Total valid votes		78,789		
Rejected ballots		6,378	7.49%	▲5.79
Registered electors		123,675		▲25.05
INC gain from JP		Swing	▼3.90	

=== Assembly Election 1985 ===
1985 Karnataka Legislative Assembly election : Kumta
Party	Candidate	Votes	%	±%
JP	N. H. Gouda	30,959	47.76%	▲25.71
INC	Nayak Honnappa Lakshman	22,706	35.03%	▲1.25
BJP	Karki. M. P	6,312	9.74%	▼27.55
Independent	Keshav Durgappa Naik	3,730	5.75%	New
Independent	Manohar Hanamayya Naik	462	0.71%	New
Independent	Naik Nandish Jattappa	403	0.62%	New
Margin of victory		8,253	12.73%	▲9.22
Turnout		65,949	66.68%	▲2.70
Total valid votes		64,826		
Rejected ballots		1,123	1.70%	▼0.83
Registered electors		98,899		▲9.52
JP gain from BJP		Swing	▲10.47	

=== Assembly Election 1983 ===
1983 Karnataka Legislative Assembly election : Kumta
Party	Candidate	Votes	%	±%
BJP	Karki. M. P	21,004	37.29%	New
INC	Nayak Seetaram Vasudev	19,026	33.78%	▲29.38
JP	Naik Shivaram Jatti	12,421	22.05%	▼20.73
Independent	Lakkumane Rama Shivappa	1,890	3.36%	New
Independent	Gaonkar Vasant Narayan	1,506	2.67%	New
Independent	Ganjekar Shesh Durga	475	0.84%	New
Margin of victory		1,978	3.51%	▼1.44
Turnout		57,781	63.98%	▼5.95
Total valid votes		56,322		
Rejected ballots		1,459	2.53%	▲0.02
Registered electors		90,305		▲5.35
BJP gain from INC(I)		Swing	▼10.44	

=== Assembly Election 1978 ===
1978 Karnataka Legislative Assembly election : Kumta
Party	Candidate	Votes	%	±%
INC(I)	Nayak Seetaram Vasudev	27,894	47.73%	New
JP	Naik Ranayya Shivappa	25,001	42.78%	New
INC	Naik Ramakant Raghavendra	2,573	4.40%	▼51.58
Independent	Gajanan Krishna Bhat	1,247	2.13%	New
Independent	Naik Nalini Balakrishna	918	1.57%	New
Independent	Venkatraman Krishna Gaonkar	807	1.38%	New
Margin of victory		2,893	4.95%	▼14.68
Turnout		59,945	69.93%	▲6.00
Total valid votes		58,440		
Rejected ballots		1,505	2.51%	▲2.51
Registered electors		85,720		▲38.32
INC(I) gain from INC		Swing	▼8.25	

=== Assembly Election 1972 ===
1972 Mysore State Legislative Assembly election : Kumta
Party	Candidate	Votes	%	±%
INC	Sitaram Vasudev Naik	21,698	55.98%	▲30.68
INC(O)	Ramachandra. S. Bhagwat	14,088	36.34%	New
ABJS	Hegde Ganapatishankar	2,976	7.68%	New
Margin of victory		7,610	19.63%	▼25.82
Turnout		39,617	63.93%	▼2.04
Total valid votes		38,762		
Registered electors		61,973		▲9.47
INC gain from Independent		Swing	▼14.77	

=== Assembly Election 1967 ===
1967 Mysore State Legislative Assembly election : Kumta
Party	Candidate	Votes	%	±%
Independent	H. R. Manjanath	25,049	70.75%	New
INC	M. V. Vimalanand	8,957	25.30%	▼25.18
Independent	N. V. Timmappa	1,401	3.96%	New
Margin of victory		16,092	45.45%	▲34.70
Turnout		37,344	65.97%	▲12.35
Total valid votes		35,407		
Registered electors		56,610		▼3.67
Independent gain from INC		Swing	▲20.27	

=== Assembly Election 1962 ===
1962 Mysore State Legislative Assembly election : Kumta
Party	Candidate	Votes	%	±%
INC	Vasantlata. V. Mirjankar	14,225	50.48%	▲4.49
PSP	Narayan Keshav Pai	11,197	39.73%	▲10.44
ABJS	Narasinh Govind Shanbhag	1,530	5.43%	New
Independent	Venktappa Naik	624	2.21%	New
Independent	Seetaram Nagappa Shanbhag	604	2.14%	New
Margin of victory		3,028	10.75%	▼5.95
Turnout		31,512	53.62%	▼1.81
Total valid votes		28,180		
Registered electors		58,767		▲6.73
INC hold		Swing	▲4.49	

=== Assembly Election 1957 ===
1957 Mysore State Legislative Assembly election : Kumta
Party	Candidate	Votes	%	±%
INC	Vasantlata. V. Mirjankar	14,034	45.99%	▲1.00
PSP	Chittal Damodhar Vithoba	8,938	29.29%	New
Independent	Naik Devappa Ayyu	3,459	11.33%	New
Independent	Hegde Shridhar Ishwar	2,385	7.82%	New
Independent	Shanbhag Sitaram Nagappa	1,702	5.58%	New
Margin of victory		5,096	16.70%	▲4.81
Turnout		30,518	55.43%	▼4.79
Total valid votes		30,518		
Registered electors		55,060		▼1.08
INC hold		Swing	▲1.00	

=== Assembly Election 1952 ===
1952 Bombay State Legislative Assembly election : Kumta Honavar
Party	Candidate	Votes	%	±%
INC	Ramkrishna Biranna Naik	15,079	44.99%	New
SP	Narayan Gopal Naik	11,095	33.10%	New
Independent	Kamat Laxman Subraya	6,154	18.36%	New
Independent	Gauda Lingu Gopu	1,191	3.55%	New
Margin of victory		3,984	11.89%	
Turnout		33,519	60.22%	
Total valid votes		33,519		
Registered electors		55,661		
INC win (new seat)				

== See also ==
- List of constituencies of the Karnataka Legislative Assembly
- Uttara Kannada district
