= Topinkatti =

Village in Karnataka, India

- Village
- Country: India
- State: Karnataka
- District: Belgaum
- Talukas: Khanapur

Government
  - Body: Gram panchayat

Population (2001)
  - Total: 5,000

Languages
  - Official: Kannada
- Time zone: UTC+5:30 (IST)
- Postal code: 591302

Topinkatti is a village in the Belgaum district of Karnataka, India, with a population of approximately 5,000. The residents primarily speak Marathi and Kannada. This village shares a gram panchayat with two neighboring villages. It is located 10 km from Khanapur and 26 km from Belgaum.
