= Mouje Nandgad =

- Village
- Nandgad
- Location in Karnataka, India Mouje Nandgad (India)
- Coordinates: 15.90°N 75.50°E
- Country: India
- State: Karnataka
- District: Belgaum
- Taluka: Khanapur

Population (2001)
  - Total: 9,297

Languages Marathi, Kannada
  - Official: Kannada
- Time zone: UTC+5:30 (IST)

Mouje Nandgad is a village in the southern state of Karnataka, India. It is located in the Khanapur taluk of Belgaum district in Karnataka.

== Demographics ==
As of 2001 India census, Mouje Nandgad had a population of 9297 with 4715 males and 4582 females.

== See also ==
- Belgaum
- Districts of Karnataka
