= Haliyal Assembly constituency =

Legislative Assembly constituency in Karnataka State, India

Coordinates: 15.33°N 74.76°E

Haliyal
- Constituency No. 76 for the Karnataka Legislative Assembly

Constituency details
- Country: India
- Region: South India
- State: Karnataka
- District: Uttara Kannada
- Lok Sabha constituency: Uttara Kannada
- Established: 1966
- Total electors: 181,519
- Reservation: None

Member of Legislative Assembly
- 16th Karnataka Legislative Assembly
- Incumbent R. V. Deshpande
- Party: Indian National Congress
- Elected year: 2018
- Preceded by: Sunil V. Hegde

Haliyal Assembly constituency is one of the 224 Legislative Assembly constituencies of Karnataka in India.

It is part of Uttara Kannada district.

== Members of the Legislative Assembly ==
Election	Member	Party
1952	Kamat Ramchandra Gopal	Indian National Congress
1967	H. R. Mableshwar	Indian National Congress
1972	Ghadi Virupaksh Mallappa	Indian National Congress
1978	Ghadi Virupaksh Mallappa	Indian National Congress
1983	R. V. Deshpande	Janata Party
1985	R. V. Deshpande	Janata Party
1989	R. V. Deshpande	Janata Dal
1994	R. V. Deshpande	Janata Dal
1999	R. V. Deshpande	Indian National Congress
2004	R. V. Deshpande	Indian National Congress
2008	Sunil. V. Hegde	Janata Dal
2013	R. V. Deshpande	Indian National Congress
2018	R. V. Deshpande	Indian National Congress
2023	R. V. Deshpande	Indian National Congress

== Election results ==
=== Assembly Election 2023 ===
2023 Karnataka Legislative Assembly election : Haliyal
Party	Candidate	Votes	%	±%
INC	R. V. Deshpande	57,240	40.08%	▼6.33
BJP	Sunil Hegade	53,617	37.54%	▼4.99
JD(S)	Ghotnekar Shrikanth Laxman	28,814	20.17%	▲14.74
NOTA	None of the above	941	0.66%	▼0.30
Margin of victory		3,623	2.54%	▼1.33
Turnout		143,033	78.80%	▲1.63
Total valid votes		142,827		
Registered electors		181,519		▲5.41
INC hold		Swing	▼6.33	

=== Assembly Election 2018 ===
2018 Karnataka Legislative Assembly election : Haliyal
Party	Candidate	Votes	%	±%
INC	R. V. Deshpande	61,577	46.41%	▲8.59
BJP	Sunil Hegade	56,437	42.53%	▲37.14
JD(S)	K. R. Ramesh	7,209	5.43%	▼28.31
Independent	T. R. Chandrashekhar	2,629	1.98%	New
NOTA	None of the above	1,277	0.96%	New
CPI(M)	Yamuna Gaonkar	1,127	0.85%	New
AIMEP	Kakkeri Badesab Hussainsab	913	0.69%	New
Margin of victory		5,140	3.87%	▼0.21
Turnout		132,892	77.17%	▲0.92
Total valid votes		132,685		
Registered electors		172,196		▲9.23
INC hold		Swing	▲8.59	

=== Assembly Election 2013 ===
2013 Karnataka Legislative Assembly election : Haliyal
Party	Candidate	Votes	%	±%
INC	R. V. Deshpande	55,005	37.82%	▼3.03
JD(S)	Sunil Hegade	49,066	33.74%	▼12.57
BJP	Dhuli Raju	7,844	5.39%	▼1.87
KJP	Ravi Redkar	2,356	1.62%	New
Independent	Shivanand. B. Gaggari	1,547	1.06%	New
Independent	V. B. Ramachandra	954	0.66%	New
Margin of victory		5,939	4.08%	▼1.38
Turnout		120,204	76.25%	▲6.33
Total valid votes		145,439		
Registered electors		157,649		▲10.83
INC gain from JD(S)		Swing	▼8.49	

=== Assembly Election 2008 ===
2008 Karnataka Legislative Assembly election : Haliyal
Party	Candidate	Votes	%	±%
JD(S)	Sunil. V. Hegde	46,031	46.31%	▲32.22
INC	Deshpande Raghunath. V	40,606	40.85%	▼2.83
BJP	Apparao Krishna Pujari	7,219	7.26%	▼25.33
SP	Ajit Maneshwar Naik	2,035	2.05%	New
BSP	Pandurang Parasaram Patil	1,853	1.86%	New
Independent	Premanand Vishnu Gavas	1,647	1.66%	New
Margin of victory		5,425	5.46%	▼5.63
Turnout		99,455	69.92%	▼1.31
Total valid votes		99,391		
Registered electors		142,246		▼20.94
JD(S) gain from INC		Swing	▲2.63	

=== Assembly Election 2004 ===
2004 Karnataka Legislative Assembly election : Haliyal
Party	Candidate	Votes	%	±%
INC	R. V. Deshpande	55,974	43.68%	▼10.90
BJP	Patil Veerabhadragouda Shivanagowda	41,765	32.59%	New
JD(S)	S. K. Gouda	18,055	14.09%	▲12.30
JP	Jadhav Vijendra. P	8,733	6.81%	New
Kannada Nadu Party	Dhundasi Mahmadagouse Nannesab	3,623	2.83%	New
Margin of victory		14,209	11.09%	▼0.76
Turnout		128,150	71.23%	▼2.88
Total valid votes		128,150		
Registered electors		179,920		▲9.54
INC hold		Swing	▼10.90	

=== Assembly Election 1999 ===
1999 Karnataka Legislative Assembly election : Haliyal
Party	Candidate	Votes	%	±%
INC	R. V. Deshpande	63,207	54.58%	▲27.03
JD(U)	S. K. Gouda	49,483	42.73%	New
JD(S)	Dalal Liyaratali Shoukatali	2,074	1.79%	New
Independent	Maruti Parasappa Benachikar	1,052	0.91%	New
Margin of victory		13,724	11.85%	▼18.29
Turnout		121,725	74.11%	▲0.26
Total valid votes		115,816		
Rejected ballots		5,894	4.84%	▲2.82
Registered electors		164,247		▲9.30
INC gain from JD		Swing	▼3.11	

=== Assembly Election 1994 ===
1994 Karnataka Legislative Assembly election : Haliyal
Party	Candidate	Votes	%	±%
JD	R. V. Deshpande	62,722	57.69%	▲19.62
INC	S. K. Gouda	29,953	27.55%	▼10.22
BJP	R. B. Dhooli	13,263	12.20%	▲9.58
INC	M. K. Mugad	2,638	2.43%	New
Margin of victory		32,769	30.14%	▲29.84
Turnout		110,973	73.85%	▼0.36
Total valid votes		108,727		
Rejected ballots		2,246	2.02%	▼4.41
Registered electors		150,273		▲6.58
JD hold		Swing	▲19.62	

=== Assembly Election 1989 ===
1989 Karnataka Legislative Assembly election : Haliyal
Party	Candidate	Votes	%	±%
JD	R. V. Deshpande	37,274	38.07%	New
INC	Gouda Sahadev Kurjal	36,984	37.77%	▼8.53
Kranti Sabha	Bobati Udachappa Kheerappa	18,683	19.08%	New
BJP	Channaviran Parashuram Nagappa	2,569	2.62%	▲1.50
JP	Ismail Budansab Jukako	1,379	1.41%	New
Independent	Mulla Md. Shafi Md. Kasim	796	0.81%	New
Margin of victory		290	0.30%	▼5.71
Turnout		104,637	74.21%	▲2.71
Total valid votes		97,908		
Rejected ballots		6,729	6.43%	▲4.45
Registered electors		141,002		▲26.14
JD gain from JP		Swing	▼14.24	

=== Assembly Election 1985 ===
1985 Karnataka Legislative Assembly election : Haliyal
Party	Candidate	Votes	%	±%
JP	R. V. Deshpande	40,983	52.31%	▼6.33
INC	Jamalpasha Ahmed Shaiah Bashasab	36,274	46.30%	▲5.65
BJP	Vastrad Shantveerayya Rudrayya	876	1.12%	New
Margin of victory		4,709	6.01%	▼11.98
Turnout		79,929	71.50%	▲0.40
Total valid votes		78,343		
Rejected ballots		1,586	1.98%	▼1.21
Registered electors		111,786		▲7.62
JP hold		Swing	▼6.33	

=== Assembly Election 1983 ===
1983 Karnataka Legislative Assembly election : Haliyal
Party	Candidate	Votes	%	±%
JP	R. V. Deshpande	41,926	58.64%	▲23.83
INC	Ghadi Virupaksh Mallappa	29,065	40.65%	▲37.80
Independent	Borkar Nagendran Kollur	506	0.71%	New
Margin of victory		12,861	17.99%	▲2.56
Turnout		73,856	71.10%	▼2.64
Total valid votes		71,497		
Rejected ballots		2,359	3.19%	▲0.17
Registered electors		103,870		▲7.98
JP gain from INC(I)		Swing	▲8.39	

=== Assembly Election 1978 ===
1978 Karnataka Legislative Assembly election : Haliyal
Party	Candidate	Votes	%	±%
INC(I)	Ghadi Virupaksh Mallappa	34,566	50.25%	New
JP	Patil Maruti Jakkappa	23,948	34.81%	New
CPI(M)	Sthalekar Ramesh Ganapati	7,169	10.42%	▲2.07
INC	Dusagai Nazeerahmmad	1,959	2.85%	▼58.74
Independent	Rao Abdul Rahiman Hasansab	628	0.91%	New
Independent	Kerwadkar Mahadev Mallappa	524	0.76%	New
Margin of victory		10,618	15.43%	▼24.62
Turnout		70,933	73.74%	▲13.52
Total valid votes		68,794		
Rejected ballots		2,139	3.02%	▲3.02
Registered electors		96,198		▲31.95
INC(I) gain from INC		Swing	▼11.34	

=== Assembly Election 1972 ===
1972 Mysore State Legislative Assembly election : Haliyal
Party	Candidate	Votes	%	±%
INC	Ghadi Virupaksh Mallappa	26,086	61.59%	▲11.14
INC(O)	Patil Maruti Jakkappa	9,122	21.54%	New
CPI(M)	Sthalekar Ramesh Ganapati	3,536	8.35%	▲4.37
ABJS	Pai Gopalkrishna Seetaram	2,327	5.49%	New
Independent	Patil Vithalrao Bhimraya	1,176	2.78%	New
Margin of victory		16,964	40.05%	▲14.71
Turnout		43,904	60.22%	▼5.12
Total valid votes		42,354		
Registered electors		72,907		▲26.15
INC hold		Swing	▲11.14	

=== Assembly Election 1967 ===
1967 Mysore State Legislative Assembly election : Haliyal
Party	Candidate	Votes	%	±%
INC	H. R. Mableshwar	17,410	50.45%	▼0.42
Independent	P. V. R. Bheemaraya	8,664	25.10%	New
SWA	N. P. Santappa	7,064	20.47%	New
CPI(M)	D. M. Shridhar	1,374	3.98%	New
Margin of victory		8,746	25.34%	▲0.52
Turnout		37,760	65.34%	▲10.80
Total valid votes		34,512		
Registered electors		57,793		▲19.91
INC hold		Swing	▼0.42	

=== Assembly Election 1952 ===
1952 Bombay State Legislative Assembly election : Haliyal Yellapur Supa
Party	Candidate	Votes	%	±%
INC	Kamat Ramchandra Gopal	13,372	50.87%	New
SP	Gadhi Virupakshappa Mallappa	6,847	26.05%	New
CPI	Naik Purushottam Jog	3,215	12.23%	New
Independent	Nadkarni Subray Dattatraya	1,482	5.64%	New
Independent	Parulekar Govind Balkrishna	590	2.24%	New
Independent	Deshpande Vinayak Dattatraya	420	1.60%	New
Independent	Patil Hanamant Kallappa	360	1.37%	New
Margin of victory		6,525	24.82%	
Turnout		26,286	54.54%	
Total valid votes		26,286		
Registered electors		48,195		
INC win (new seat)				

== See also ==
- List of constituencies of the Karnataka Legislative Assembly
- Uttara Kannada district
