= R. V. Deshpande =

Indian politician

Raghunath Vishwanath Deshpande
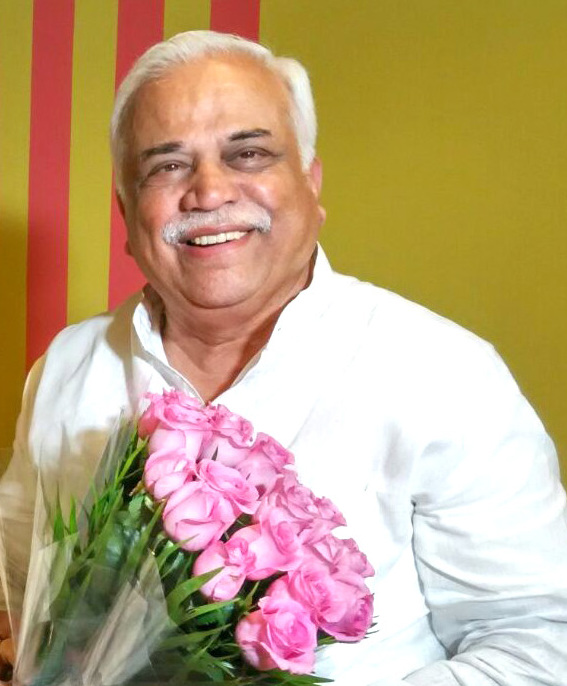

Minister of Revenue Government of Karnataka
- In office 8 June 2018 – 23 July 2019
- Chief Minister: H. D. Kumaraswamy
- Preceded by: Kagodu Thimmappa
- Succeeded by: R. Ashoka

chairperson of the Administrative Reforms Commission Government of Karnataka
- Incumbent
- Assumed office 29 Dec 2023
- Chief Minister: Siddaramaiah

Member of Karnataka Legislative Assembly
- Incumbent
- Assumed office 19 May 2018
- Constituency: Haliyal

Karnataka Pradesh Congress Committee President
- In office 2008–2010

Personal details
- Born: 16 March 1947 (age 79) Haliyal, Mysore State, (present-day Karnataka, India)
- Party: Indian National Congress

Raghunath Vishwanath Deshpande (born 16 March 1947) is an Indian politician who is chairperson of the Administrative Reforms Commission with Cabinet Minister Rank and also was the revenue minister of Karnataka 8 June 2018 to 23 July 2019. Member of the Legislative Assembly for the Haliyal constituency and he was the Minister for Medium & Heavy Industries in the cabinets headed by Siddaramaiah as well as S. M. Krishna.

== Political career ==
Raghunath holds B.A. and L.L.B. degrees. He began his political career as the President of the Karnataka State Co-operative Agriculture & Rural Development Bank.

A nine-term MLA, Deshpande started his political career in the Janata Parivar before joining the Indian National Congress in 1999. He served as Industries minister for 13 years between 1994 and 2004 and 2015 to 2018. He is also elected as pro tem Speaker of Karnataka Legislative Assembly.

== Achievements ==
During his tenure as a Minister for Medium and Heavy Industries, he was known for industrial development of Karnataka. And during his A new draft called the Tourism Trade Facilitation Act was prepared to ensure the safety of tourists coming to the state.
