= Lokmanya Tilak Municipal Medical College and General Hospital =

Government medical college and hospital

Geography
- Location: Mumbai, Maharashtra
- Coordinates: 19.036131°N 72.859268°E

Organisation
- Type: Public

Services
- Beds: 1,850

History
- Opened: 1947; 79 years ago

Links
- Website: www.ltmgh.com
Lokmanya Tilak Municipal Medical College
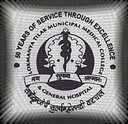
- Type: Government medical college
- Established: 1947; 79 years ago (as General Hospital); 1964; 62 years ago (as LTMMC)
- Affiliations: Maharashtra University of Health Sciences, NMC
- Dean: Dr. Pramod Ingale
- Undergraduates: 200 per academic year
- Postgraduates: 190 per academic year
- Location: Sion, Mumbai, Maharashtra, India-400022
- Nickname: LTMMC
- Website: www.ltmgh.com

Lokmanya Tilak Municipal Medical College and General Hospital is a public medical college and hospital located in Mumbai, Maharashtra, India. It is recognised by the National Medical Commission. This is one of the oldest medical colleges in Mumbai. The medical college offers MBBS, MS & MD degrees.

== History ==
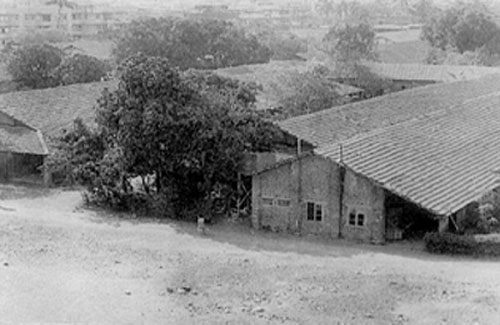
View Of LTMGH in past

It was started in 1947 with 10 beds initially, which has now grown into multi-speciality hospital with more than 1,400 beds. In the same campus, it is attached to Lokmanya Tilak Municipal Medical College (LTMMC) which is a teaching institute for undergraduate and post graduate studies in medical sciences. It is named after Lokmanya Tilak, an eminent Maharashtrian freedom fighter in pre-independence India.

== Achievements ==
On 30 November 1964 Lokmanya Tilak Medical College was established with the first batch of 60 students. At present LTMMC enrolls 200 MBBS students and 190 Post Graduate students per year in various subjects and is preferred choice amongst students.
