= Uttara Kannada Lok Sabha constituency =

Lok Sabha constituency in Karnataka

Coordinates: 14.7°N 74.6°E

Uttara Kannada
- Lok Sabha constituency
- Uttata Kannada Lok Sabha Constituency Map

Constituency details
- Country: India
- Region: South India
- State: Karnataka
- Assembly constituencies: Khanapur; Kittur; Haliyal; Karwar; Kumta; Bhatkal; Sirsi; Yellapur
- Established: 1952
- Reservation: None

Member of Parliament
- 18th Lok Sabha
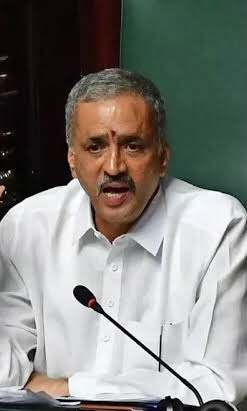
- Incumbent Vishweshwar Hegde Kageri
- Party: Bharatiya Janata Party
- Elected year: 2024

Uttara Kannada Lok Sabha constituency (formerly known as Canara), sometimes called Karwar, is one of the 28 Lok Sabha constituencies in Karnataka state in southern India. Following the delimitation of parliamentary constituencies in 2008, the constituency was renamed.

== Assembly segments ==
There are 8 assembly segments under the Uttar Kannada (North Kannada) Lok Sabha seat

No	Name	District	Member	Party	Party Leading (in 2024)
14	Khanapur	Belagavi	Vitthal Halagekar	BJP	BJP
15	Kittur	Belagavi	Babasaheb Patil	INC	BJP
76	Haliyal	Uttara Kannada	R. V. Deshpande	INC	BJP
77	Karwar	Uttara Kannada	Satish Krishna Sail	INC	BJP
78	Kumta	Uttara Kannada	Dinakar Keshav Shetty	BJP	BJP
79	Bhatkal	Uttara Kannada	M. S. Vaidya	INC	BJP
80	Sirsi	Uttara Kannada	Bhimanna T. Naik	INC	BJP
81	Yellapur	Uttara Kannada	Shivaram Hebbar	BJP	BJP

== Members of Parliament ==
Year	Member	Party
1952	Joachim Alva	Indian National Congress
1957	Joachim Alva	Indian National Congress
1962	Joachim Alva	Indian National Congress
1967	Dinakara Desai	Independent
1971	B. V. Naik	Indian National Congress
1977	Balsu Pursu Kadam	Indian National Congress
1980	G. Devaraya Naik	Indian National Congress (I)
1984	G. Devaraya Naik	Indian National Congress
1989	G. Devaraya Naik	Indian National Congress
1991	G. Devaraya Naik	Indian National Congress
1996	Anantkumar Hegde	Bharatiya Janata Party
1998	Anantkumar Hegde	Bharatiya Janata Party
1999	Margaret Alva	Indian National Congress
2004	Anantkumar Hegde	Bharatiya Janata Party
2009	Anantkumar Hegde	Bharatiya Janata Party
2014	Anantkumar Hegde	Bharatiya Janata Party
2019	Anantkumar Hegde	Bharatiya Janata Party
2024	Vishweshwar Hegde Kageri	Bharatiya Janata Party

== Election results ==
Vote share of Winning candidates
2024	61.97%
2019	68.15%
2014	54.64%
2009	44.63%
2004	51.94%
1999	47.85%
1998	50.74%
1996	42.92%
1991	35.53%
1989	38.02%
1984	50.25%
1980	57.97%
1977	51.71%
1971	67.84%
1967	51.17%
1962	46.72%
1957	48.81%
1952	60.54%

=== 2024 ===
2024 Indian general election: Uttara Kannada
Party	Candidate	Votes	%	±%
BJP	Vishweshwar Hegde Kageri	782,495	61.97	▼6.18
INC	Anjali Nimbalkar	445,067	35.25	
NOTA	None of the Above	10,176	0.81	▼0.58
IND	8 Independent Candidates	17,722	1.40	
OTH	3 Other Party Candidates	7,301	0.58	
Majority		337,428	26.72	▼14.87
Turnout		1,263,871	76.80	▲2.64
BJP hold		Swing		

=== 2019 ===
2019 Indian general election: Uttara Kannada
Party	Candidate	Votes	%	±%
BJP	Anantkumar Hegde	786,042	68.15	▲13.51
JD(S)	Anand Asnotikar	306,393	26.56	
NOTA	None of the Above	16,017	1.39	▼0.24
BSP	Sudhakar Kira Jogalekar	7,195	0.62	▼0.12
IND	6 Independent Candidates	25,915	2.25	
OTH	4 Other Party Candidates	11,918	1.03	
Majority		479,649	41.59	▲27.53
Turnout		1,154,390	74.16	▲5.12
BJP hold		Swing		

=== 2014 ===
2014 Indian general election: Uttara Kannada
Party	Candidate	Votes	%	±%
BJP	Anantkumar Hegde	546,939	54.64	▲10.01
INC	Prashant R. Deshpande	406,239	40.58	▼1.05
NOTA	None of the Above	16,277	1.63	
BSP	Naik Santhosh	7,404	0.74	▼0.49
AAP	Raghavendra K. Thane	6,215	0.62	
IND	2 Independent Candidates	7,811	0.78	
OTH	3 Other Party Candidates	10,153	1.01	
Majority		140,700	14.06	▲11.06
Turnout		1,001,470	69.04	▲9.95
BJP hold		Swing		

=== 2009 ===
2009 Indian general election: Uttara Kannada
Party	Candidate	Votes	%	±%
BJP	Anantkumar Hegde	339,300	44.63	▼7.31
INC	Margaret Alva	316,531	41.63	▲10.34
JD(S)	V. D. Hegade	48,850	6.43	▼1.90
IND	Yashwant Timmanna Nippanikar	15,836	2.08	
BSP	Hadapad Basavaraj Dundappa	9,340	1.23	
SS	D. M. Gurav	8,095	1.06	
IND	Khazi Rahmatulla Abdul Wahab	7,280	0.96	
IND	L. P. M. Naik	5,895	0.78	
IND	Uday Babu Khalvadekar	3,283	0.43	
IND	Abdul Rasheed Shaikh	3,000	0.39	
JD(U)	Elish Kotiyal	2,865	0.38	
Majority		22,769	3.00	▼17.65
Turnout		760,275	59.09	
BJP hold		Swing		

=== 2004 ===
2004 Indian general election: Kanara
Party	Candidate	Votes	%	±%
BJP	Anantkumar Hegde	433,174	51.94	▲5.51
INC	Margaret Alva	260,948	31.29	▼16.56
JD(S)	G. Devaraya Naik	69,487	8.33	▲3.46
JP	Neernalli Ramakrishn	24,213	2.90	
KNDP	Jayant Mukund Tinaikar	19,840	2.38	
IND	Mutaguppi Laxmesh Putta	17,513	2.10	
IND	Ajeya Madhav Shanbhag	8,757	1.05	
Majority		172,226	20.65	▲19.23
Turnout		833,932		
BJP gain from INC		Swing		

=== 1999 ===
1999 Indian general election: Kanara
Party	Candidate	Votes	%	±%
INC	Margaret Alva	356,246	47.85	▲9.28
BJP	Anantkumar Hegde	345,655	46.43	▼4.31
JD(S)	Gardikar Damodhar Narayana Naik	36,258	4.87	
NCP	Nayak Balakrishna Venkanna	3,301	0.44	
AJBP	M. K. S. Kalbagkar	3,074	0.41	
Majority		10,591	1.42	▼10.75
Turnout		773,556	70.25	▲2.98
INC gain from BJP		Swing		

=== 1998 ===
1998 Indian general election: Kanara
Party	Candidate	Votes	%	±%
BJP	Anantkumar Hegde	363,051	50.74	▲7.82
INC	Margaret Alva	276,004	38.57	▲24.81
JD	Bobati Udachappa Kheerappa	36,558	5.11	▼29.13
KVP	Bhemanna Naik	27,022	3.78	
IND	I. M. Rizwan	7,163	1.00	
SP	Lalita G. Hegde	3,623	0.51	
IND	M. K. Shanbhag Kalbagkar	2,122	0.30	
Majority		87,047	12.17	▲3.49
Turnout		730,812	67.27	▲5.27
BJP hold		Swing		

=== 1996 ===
1996 Indian general election: Kanara
Party	Candidate	Votes	%	±%
BJP	Anantkumar Hegde	276,311	42.92	▲13.60
JD	Pramod Hegde	220,415	34.24	▲8.52
INC	Rama Narayan Naik	88,609	13.76	▼21.77
KCP	N. M. Naik	43,694	6.79	
IND	Naik Balakrishna Venkanna	7,466	1.16	
IND	K. Khargekar Annandrao	2,211	0.34	
IND	Goankar Rajmahendra	2,168	0.34	
IND	Naik Mallu Bhikaro	1,527	0.24	
IND	Ganapati Devanna Naik	1,420	0.22	
Majority		55,896	8.68	▲2.47
Turnout		662,500	62.00	▲10.60
BJP gain from INC		Swing		

=== 1991 ===
1991 Indian general election: Kanara
Party	Candidate	Votes	%	±%
INC	G. Devaraya Naik	171,436	35.53	▼2.49
BJP	Karki Manjunath	141,472	29.32	
JD	R. V. Deshpande	124,123	25.72	▼7.31
KRRS	Bobati Udachappa Kheerappa	45,515	9.43	▼3.30
Majority		29,964	6.21	▲1.22
Turnout		497,775	51.40	▼17.50
INC hold		Swing		

=== 1989 ===
1989 Indian general election: Kanara
Party	Candidate	Votes	%	±%
INC	G. Devaraya Naik	240,571	38.02	▼12.23
JD	Anant Nag	209,003	33.03	
KRRS	Pattekar Basanna Nagesh	80,566	12.73	
IND	Shivram Karanth	58,902	9.31	
JP	Naik Bhairav Das	23,616	3.73	▼36.09
IND	Dharashwar Manjunath Shridhar	9,352	1.48	
IND	Naik Vasu Kanna	4,155	0.66	
IND	Krishna Vasu Naik	3,217	0.51	
IND	Naik Dakappa Nagappa	1,754	0.28	
IND	Keshav Durgappa Naik	1,577	0.25	
Majority		31,568	4.99	▼5.44
Turnout		668,957	68.90	▲2.52
INC hold		Swing		

=== 1984 ===
1984 Indian general election: Kanara
Party	Candidate	Votes	%	±%
INC	G. Devaraya Naik	237,064	50.25	▼7.72
JP	G. S. Hegde Ajjibal	187,866	39.82	▲9.99
IND	Yallurkar Kisanrao Sidary	23,428	4.97	
IND	Balchandra Shankareppa Badiger	9,932	2.11	
IND	M. G. Ramesh	7,331	1.55	
IND	Naik Balakrishna Venkappa	6,120	1.30	
Majority		49,198	10.43	▼17.71
Turnout		486,027	66.38	▲4.63
INC hold		Swing		

=== 1980 ===
1980 Indian general election: Kanara
Party	Candidate	Votes	%	±%
INC(I)	G. Devaraya Naik	240,431	57.97	▲6.26
JP	R. V. Deshpande	123,731	29.83	▼12.81
INC(U)	Kadam Balsu Pursu	46,549	11.22	
IND	Sulebhavi Allisab Bawasab	4,058	0.98	
Majority		116,700	28.14	▲19.07
Turnout		429,493	61.75	▼5.26
INC(I) hold		Swing		

=== 1977 ===
1977 Indian general election: Kanara
Party	Candidate	Votes	%	±%
INC	Kadam Balsu Pursu	195,974	51.71	▼16.13
JP	Ramakrishna Hegde	161,580	42.64	
IND	B. V. Naik	16,702	4.41	
IND	Shankargouda Chanabasappa Patil	4,700	1.24	
Majority		34,394	9.07	▼31.64
Turnout		391,234	67.01	▲16.86
INC hold		Swing		

=== 1971 ===
1971 Indian general election: Kanara
Party	Candidate	Votes	%	±%
INC	B. V. Naik	161,296	67.84	▲26.60
IND	Dinkar Desai	64,517	27.13	
IND	Dhakappa Shriram Sheshgiri	9,518	4.00	
IND	Pawar Kamalakar Subbarao	2,440	1.03	
Majority		96,779	40.71	▲30.78
Turnout		247,689	50.15	▼14.09
INC gain from Independent		Swing		

=== 1967 ===
1967 Indian general election: Kanara
Party	Candidate	Votes	%	±%
IND	Dinakara Desai	143,287	51.17	
INC	N. G. Vaman	115,490	41.24	▼5.48
IND	B. V. Venkataraman	13,035	4.65	
IND	B. S. Shambhu	8,220	2.94	
Majority		27,797	9.93	▲2.95
Turnout		297,779	64.24	▲3.06
Independent gain from INC		Swing		

=== 1962 ===
1962 Indian general election: Kanara
Party	Candidate	Votes	%	±%
INC	Joachim Alva	132,958	46.72	▼2.09
IND	Manohar Dattatray Malgaonkar	113,089	39.74	
IND	Shambhu Prabhu Bhat	18,792	6.60	
CPI	Dhareshwar	13,132	4.61	
IND	Yeshvant Shripad Damle	6,598	2.32	
Majority		19,869	6.98	▼15.98
Turnout		298,758	61.18	▲4.85
INC hold		Swing		

=== 1957 ===
1957 Indian general election: Kanara
Party	Candidate	Votes	%	±%
INC	Joachim Alva	118,550	48.81	▼11.73
PSP	Divekar Maha Baleshwar Rudra	62,783	25.85	
IND	Malgaonkar Manohar Dattatray	50,265	20.70	
IND	Bhat Shambhu Shambhu	11,269	4.64	
Majority		55,767	22.96	▲1.88
Turnout		242,867	56.33	▼5.86
INC hold		Swing		

=== 1952 ===
1951–52 Indian general election: Kanara
Party	Candidate	Votes	%	±%
INC	Joachim Alva	139,557	60.54	
Socialist	Dinakara Desai	90,955	39.46	
Majority		48,602	21.08	
Turnout		230,512	62.19	
INC win (new seat)				

== See also ==
- List of constituencies of the Lok Sabha
