= Kerwad (Gundyanati) =

- Village
- Country: India
- State: Karnataka
- District: Belgaum
- Talukas: Khanapur

Languages
  - Official: Kannada
- Time zone: UTC+5:30 (IST)
- ISO 3166 code: IN-KA

Kerwad (Gundyanati) is a village in Belgaum district in Karnataka, India.
