= G. Devaraya Naik =

Indian politician

G. Devaraya Naik (c. 1947 – 12 July 2017) was an Indian politician.

Naik was born in Siddapur taluk, Gavinagudda village. He was elected as the MP to the Indian Parliament from Uttara Kannada (Canara) Constituency from Congress four times in 1980, 1984, 1989, and 1991.

== See also ==
- Uttara Kannada
