= Vishweshwar Hegde Kageri =

Indian politician

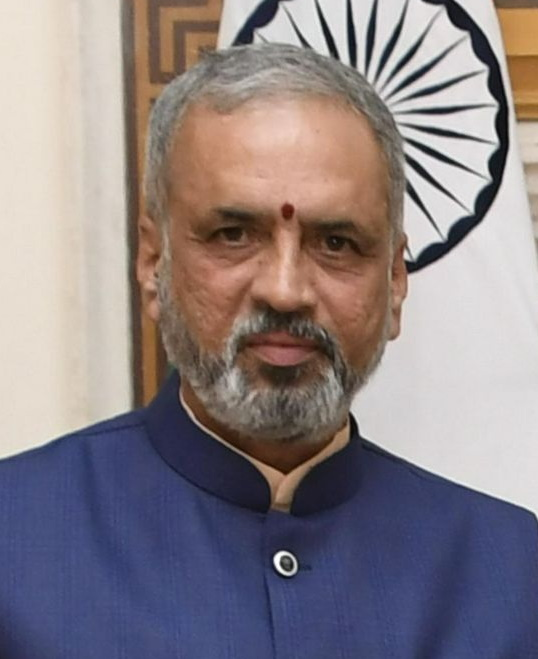

Member of Parliament, Lok Sabha
- Incumbent
- Assumed office 4 June 2024
- Preceded by: Ananth Kumar Hegde
- Constituency: Uttara Kannada

16th Speaker of the Karnataka Legislative Assembly
- In office 31 July 2019 – 20 May 2023
- Preceded by: K. R. Ramesh Kumar
- Succeeded by: U. T. Khadar

Minister of Primary & Secondary Education Government of Karnataka
- In office 30 May 2008 – 13 May 2013
- Chief Minister: B. S. Yediyurappa; Sadananda Gowda; Jagadish Shettar
- Preceded by: Basavaraj Horatti
- Succeeded by: Kimmane Rathnakar

Member of Karnataka Legislative Assembly
- In office 2008 – 13 May 2023
- Preceded by: Vivekananda Vaidya
- Succeeded by: Bhimanna Naik
- Constituency: Sirsi
- In office 1994–2008
- Preceded by: Umesh Bhat
- Succeeded by: Constituency defunct
- Constituency: Ankola

Personal details
- Born: 10 July 1961 (age 65) Sirsi, Uttara Kannada, Mysore State, India
- Party: Bharatiya Janata Party
- Spouse: Bharati Hegde
- Children: Jayalakshmi, Rajalakshmi, Shreelakshmi
- Parent(s): Anant Shivram Hegde, Sarweshwari Hegde
- Education: Karnatak University
- Occupation: Farmer, politician

Vishweshwar Hegde Kageri (born 10 July 1961) is an Indian politician and the incumbent Member of Parliament of Uttara Kannada Lok Sabha constituency. He is a member of the Bharatiya Janata Party in Karnataka. He was a six-term and former Member of the Karnataka Legislative Assembly. He served as the Minister for Primary and Secondary Education from 2008 to 2013 in the Government of Karnataka. He also served as the 16th Speaker of the Karnataka Legislative Assembly from 31 June 2019 to 20 May 2023.

He completed his B.Com. from Karnatak University, Dharwad. He was an Akhil Bharatiya Vidyarthi Parishad office bearer during his college days and was an influential student union leader.

He represented the Ankola Assembly constituency for 3 terms: 1994–99, 1999–04, and 2004–2008. After the delimitation process, he shifted to the newly created Sirsi constituency and won the seat in 2008, 2013, and, 2018 elections. He served as MLA for 6 terms in his political career & is renowned as a very disciplined politician. He was a very good speaker of the Karnataka assembly and a disciplined politician of the BJP Karnataka assembly. However, he lost his seat to a Congress candidate during the 2023 Karnataka elections. In March 2024, he was announced as the BJP candidate from the Uttara Kannada Constituency for the 2024 Lok Sabha Elections. which he won

== Contempt of Court Allegations (2009) ==
Kageri faced a criminal contempt petition and High Court orders for the framing of charges against him. This was related to the state government's language policy and its rejection of applications from schools to start English medium classes, a decision that allegedly disobeyed High Court orders on the right to choose the medium of instruction.
