= Dinakar Keshav Shetty =

Indian politician (born 1957)

Dinakar Keshav Shetty (born 21 July 1957) is an Indian politician from Karnataka. He is an MLA from Kumta Assembly constituency in Uttara Kannada district. He won the 2023 Karnataka Legislative Assembly election representing Bharatiya Janata Party.

He was Chairperson of Legislative committee on Backward Classes and Minorities Welfare in Karnataka Assembly.

== Early life and education ==
Shetty is from Kumta, Uttara Kannada district. His father is Keshav Venkataraman. He completed his Class 12 in commerce in 1975 at D. A. V. Baaliga Commerce College, Kumta.

== Career ==
Shetty won the Kumta Assembly constituency representing the Bharatiya Janata Party in the 2023 Karnataka Legislative Assembly election. He secured 59,965 votes, defeating his closest rival, Suraj Naik Soni of Janata Dal (Secular), by a narrow margin of 676 votes. He successfully retained the seat, which he had previously won in the 2018 Karnataka Legislative Assembly election, where he defeated Sharada Mohan Shetty of the Indian National Congress. He first became an MLA after winning the 2008 Karnataka Legislative Assembly election as a Janata Dal (Secular) candidate, narrowly defeating Mohan Krishna Shetty of the Indian National Congress by just 20 votes.
