= Haigunda =

Haigunda is a village located in an island in Sharavathi river, Honnavara taluk, Karnataka.

== Antiquity ==
Haigunda, previously known as Paivegundapura, is located on an island in the river Sharavathi in Uttara Kannada district and it is at a distance of 20 km from Honnavara. The village is known for pre-historic art and the Yaksha stone statue found in Haigunda is dated around the first-second century A.D. The statue is 1.80 meters tall. Yaksha statue is locally called as Babri and as on 2014, it is in a state of semi-neglect. There are also three other statues which are slightly disfigured and one is Mahavishnu and two of them have Buddhist look. Legend says that Kadamba king Mayuravarma brought 32 Havyaka families from Ahichatra (located in present-day Uttar Pradesh) to Talagunda to perform Vedic rituals. However, the inscription found at Talagunda mentions they were brought to agrahara in Talagunda. There were several sacrificial altars inland and bricks used for them are still found and used for other building purposes by local people. Also, you can read the story of Haigunda Island in the Kannada language here.
