= Raghu (Kadamba king) =

- Dharmamahārājadhirāja

King of the Kadamba Kingdom
- Reign: c. 410 - 425 CE
- Predecessor: Bhageerath
- Successor: Kakusthavarma
- House: Kadamba
- Father: Bhageerath

Raghu (r. c. 410 – 425 CE) was a ruler of the Kadamba dynasty in South India. He succeeded his father Bhageerath as king.

== Life ==
Raghu's reign seems to have involved several military undertakings, as he is said to have "subdued his enemies by his valour". George M. Moraes interprets this to mean that Raghu quelled the rebellions of local chiefs who were eager to assert their independence after the death of King Bhageerath, as the Talagunda pillar inscription seems to imply that Raghu had to struggle to preserve the integrity of his inherited kingdom during the early years of his reign. The inscription also indicates that Raghu was a great warrior who was fond of personally partaking in battles, for it describes the king's face as being "marked with the weapons of his enemies in combat".

Raghu seems to have had a cordial relationship with his younger brother, Kakusthavarma, who was appointed as Yuvaraja or Crown prince during his reign. Kakusthavarma seems to have held court at Palashika (present-day Halasi), from where he issued land grants. The city of Palashika functioned as a secondary capital of the Kadamba kingdom, while Banavasi was the primary capital. Raghu probably died without any issue, as upon his death he was succeeded by Kakusthavarma.
