= Kangavarma =

- Dharmamahārājadhirāja

King of the Kadamba Kingdom
- Reign: c. 360 - 385 CE
- Predecessor: Mayurasharma
- Successor: Bhageerath
- House: Kadamba

Kangavarma (r. c. 360 – 385 CE) or Kangavarman was the second ruler of the Kadamba dynasty in South India. His name is sometimes also read as Skandavarman. Kangavarma succeeded his father Mayurasharma, the founder of the Kadamba kingdom.

== Life ==
The Talagunda pillar inscription indicates that Kangavarma's reign was a turbulent one with many bitter wars. Although we lack details of the wars which Kangavarma had to face, it is likely that the Vakatakas were among his foremost enemies. In particular, Kangavarman's contemporary to the north was the Vakataka king Vindhyasena of Vatsagulma or Prithvisena I, who is credited with a victory against the Kadambas. While some scholars agree that Kangavarma suffered defeat at the hands of the Vakatakas, other scholars believe that Kangavarma was mostly successful in resisting the Vakataka invasion and preserving the independence of the Kadamba kingdom.

Kangavarma assumed the title Dharmamahārājadhirāja, which continued to be used by his successors. Similar titles were used by other dynasties of South India including the Pallavas and the later Chalukyas of Badami, as well as by the Vakataka rivals of the Kadambas. Kangavarma also used the surname of varma (which was historically associated with the Kshatriya caste) instead of sharma, a convention which many later Kadamba kings followed. Kangavarma was succeeded on the Kadamba throne by his son Bhageerath.
