= Chandravalli =

Archaeological site in Karnataka, India

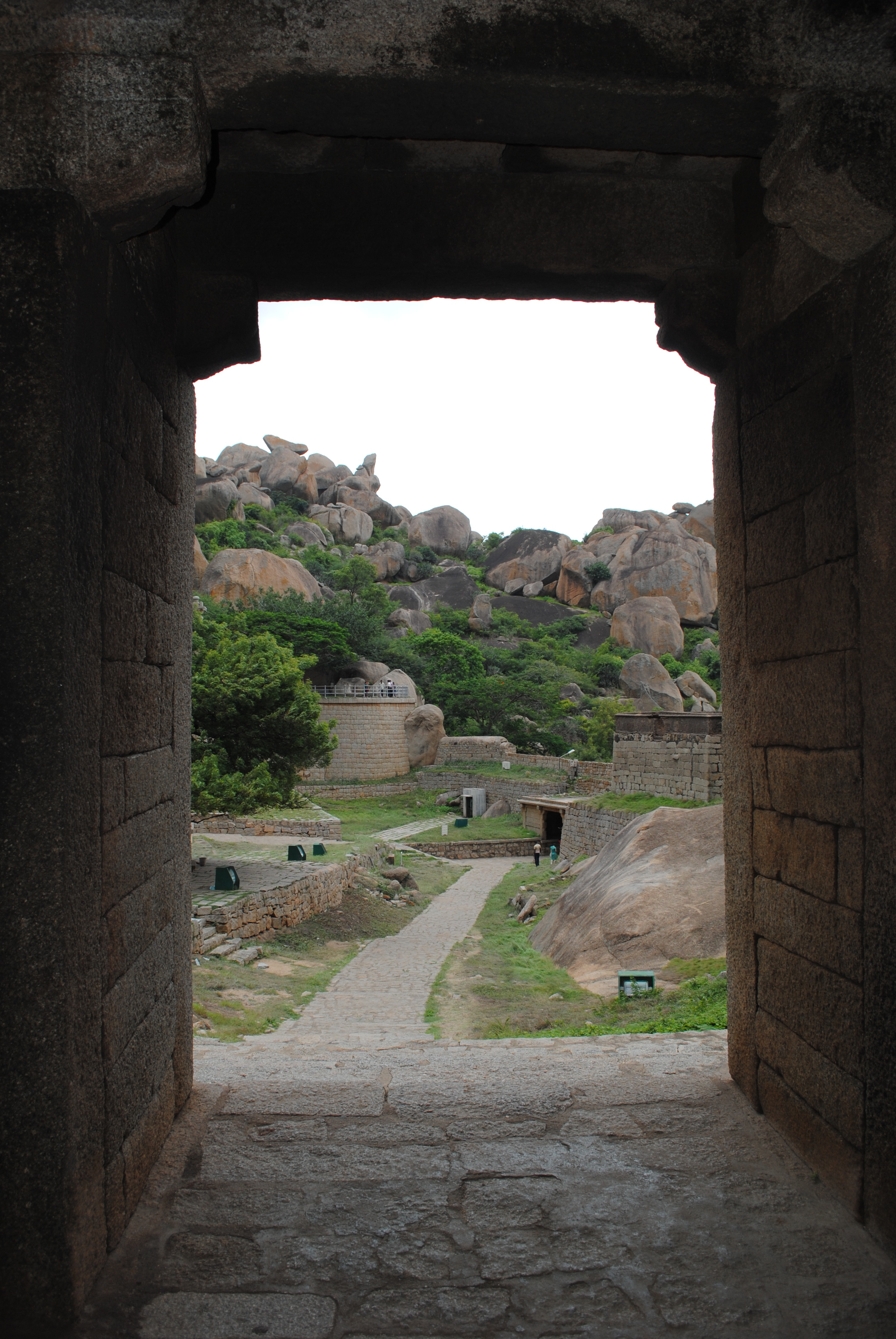
- Chandravalli

- Location within India
- 14°12′32″N 76°23′10″E
- Type: Settlement
- Periods: Satavahana
- Location: Chitradurga, Karnataka, India

Site notes
- Length: 730 m (2,400 ft)
- Width: 730 m (2,400 ft)
- Area: 53.3 ha (132 acres)

Chandravalli is an archaeological site located in the Chitradurga district of the state of Karnataka, India. The region is a valley formed by three hills, Chitradurga, Kirabanakallu and Jolagudda. It is a semi-arid region with scrub vegetation with a stream running through it. Excavations at Chandravalli have revealed earthen pots, painted bowls and coins of Indian dynasties like Vijayanagar, Satavahana and Hoysalas as well as denarii of Roman emperor Augustus Caesar and a coin of the Chinese Han dynasty Emperor Wu Ti belonging to 2nd Century BC.

== Mythology ==
Chandravalli (moon shaped), name attributed to the king as this place was once ruled by Chandrahasa (king of Kuntala).

== Chandravalli cave temple ==
The Chandravalli cave temple (also known as the Ankali Mutt - Saints from Ankalagi (Belgaum) came here for meditation) is semilunar in shape located between two giant monolithic rocks, a pre-historic site is about three km from Chitradurga. There is a lake which is adds the importance to cave temple. The forest around the lake is a good place for bird watching.

== History ==
At Chandravalli there is a rock inscription of the first Kannada dynasty Kadambas founder Mayurasharma (345 CE) found in the Bhairaweshwara temple. Chandravalli is the first capital city of Kadamba dynasty.

=== Prehistoric period ===
Chandravalli is pre-historic archaeological site, historians found painted pottery and coins from the pre-historic and Shatavahana period and found that the human habitation existed during the Iron Age.

=== Excavation history ===
In 1909 B L Rice, R Narasimhachar and R Shamashastry carried out the excavation work at Chandravalli. During 1929-30 M H Krishna did the significant contribution.

Chandravalli was first excavated by R. Narasimhachar who was the Director of Department of Archaeology and Museums of the Mysore state. Further excavations were carried out by H. M. Krishna in 1928-29 and finally by Mortimer Wheeler under the guidance of the Archaeological Survey of India in 1947.

Findings

Two distinct periods; megalithic and Satavahana were noticed during the excavations. It was found that Chandravalli was inhabited from Iron Age onwards. The inscriptions found in the nearby hillocks belonged to the Chalukya and Hoysala period, with one belonging to the king Mayurasharma, the founder of the Kadamba dynasty.

General layout

The total measurement of the site excavated was 730 m × 730 m, and the general layout of the site contained a housing complex with walls of bricks, covered stone drains, red-gravel rammed floors and fireplaces made of bricks. It was also a mortuary site.

Earthen ware

The earthen ware found included megalithic pottery, painted vessels coated by a russet coloured wash (Russet-coated painted ware), red and black coloured ware as well as rouletted ware. The paintings on these wares were linear and geometric and consisted of criss-cross, dotted lines, hatched triangles and other patterns. The shapes of these wares were vessels with funnel-shaped lid, carinated bowls, three-legged vessels and other forms.

Coins

Coins of the following Indian kings were found: Krishnaraja Wodeyar III of Mysore, Krishnadevaraya of Vijayanagar, various Satavahana kings and Viraraya of Hoysala kingdom. Among the foreign coins found were denarii of Augustus Caesar and a coin of the Chinese Han dynasty Emperor Wu Ti.

Trade ties with ancient Rome

Assessment of historic settlement has led to an interesting finding on the existence of commercial contacts with ancient Roman world.

Other objects

Other objects found included neoliths, a cist with a skeleton in it, pots containing bones and teeth of animals and a Roman bulla. One of the cists also appeared to contain the legs of a sarcophagus.
