= Kakusthavarma =

- Dharmamahārājadhirāja

King of the Kadamba Kingdom
- Reign: r. c. 425 – 450 CE
- Predecessor: Raghu
- Successor: Santivarma (at Banavasi); Krishnavarma I (at Triparvatha)
- Issue: Santivarma and Krishnavarma I
- House: Kadamba
- Father: Bhageerath
- Religion: Jainism

Kakusthavarma (r. c. 425 – 450 CE) or Kakusthavarman was a ruler of the Kadamba dynasty in South India. He succeeded his brother Raghu as king. Under Kakusthavarma's rule the Kadamba kingdom attained the height of its power and influence, and the Kadambas enjoyed close diplomatic relations with the great royal houses of India. The Talagunda and Halmidi inscriptions praise Kakusthavarma as a formidable Kadamba warrior.

== Early life ==
Kakusthavarma was born to King Bhageerath, the third ruler of the Kadamba dynasty. Upon his father's death, Kakusthavarma's elder brother Raghu assumed the throne of the Kadamba kingdom, with Kakusthavarma as Yuvaraja or Crown Prince. Kakusthavarma held court as the heir apparent, perhaps at Palashika (present-day Halasi) from where he is known to have issued land grants. In due course, he succeeded his brother on the Kadamba throne.

== Reign ==
Kakusthavarma's reign is notable for the marriage alliances that he contracted with other powerful dynasties. Most importantly, Kakusthavarma married one of his daughters into the imperial Gupta family. It is also likely that Kakusthavarma married another one of his daughters to the Vakataka prince Narendrasena, as the Vakataka records describe Narendrasena's wife Ajjhitabhattarika as a princess of the Kuntala country which probably corresponds to the Kadamba kingdom.

Kakusthavarma appears to have been a great builder and avid patron of secular architecture as well as of religious causes. He is described as possessing numerous palaces adorned with gopuras. Kakusthavarma's son and successor, Santivarma, records in his Talagunda pillar inscription that his father had constructed a great water tank near a Shiva temple at which Satakarni and other kings of the past had worshipped. Kakusthavarma himself appears to have had Jain religious tendencies, as in his grant at Halasi he begins with an invocation to Jinendra, the lord of the Jinas, and likely patronized a Jain temple at this place.

== Successors ==
Upon Kakusthavarma's death, the Kadamba kingdom appears to have been divided between his progeny. One of Kakusthavarma's sons, Santivarma, succeeded his father at Banavasi and ruled over the northern part of the Kadamba realm. Another one of Kakusthavarma's sons, Krishnavarma I, seems to have founded a cadet branch of the Kadamba dynasty at Triparvatha, in the southern part of the Kadamba realm.
