= Bhageerath =

- Dharmamahārājadhirāja

King of the Kadamba Kingdom
- Reign: c. 385 - 410 CE
- Predecessor: Kangavarma
- Successor: Raghu
- Issue: Raghu; Kakusthavarma
- House: Kadamba

Bhageerath (reigned c. 385 – 410 CE) was a king of the Kadamba dynasty in South India. He succeeded his father Kangavarma on the Kadamba throne.

== Life ==
Bhageerath is praised as a "king loved by his kingdom just as a husband is held dear by his bride". In the royal pillar inscription at Talagunda, he is described as the "sole lord" of the lady that is the Kadamba country. According to historian George M. Moraes, this phrase is meant to imply that Bhageerath had strengthened and consolidated his kingdom and established himself as the sole monarch of the Kadamba lands, perhaps after vanquishing his foes.

Several scholars identify Bhageerath with the unnamed "ruler of the Kuntala country" or Kuntaleshwara who received an embassy from the Gupta emperor Chandragupta Vikramaditya. This embassy was led by the famous poet Kalidasa, and was mentioned in the Sringaraprakasika of the poet Bhoja as well as in two other later works, the Kavyamimamsa of Rajashekhara and the Auchityavicharacharcha of Kshemendra. One of the primary purposes of this embassy seems to have been to negotiate a marriage alliance between the two royal houses. The establishment of such diplomatic relations with the leading figures of India at the time shows the high status and prestige that King Bhageerath and his country must have enjoyed.

Bhageerath had at least two sons, named Raghu and Kakusthavarma. Raghu, the eldest son, seems to have been greatly fond of war and relished personally partaking in battles, as his face is described as being "marked with the weapons of his enemies in combat with opposing warriors". Kakusthavarma, the younger son, is known to have entered into marital relations with the Guptas, perhaps as a result of the Gupta embassy sent to his father's court. Upon Bhageerath's death, Raghu ascended the Kadamba throne, while Kakusthavarma was appointed as Yuvaraja or Crown Prince and would eventually become king as well.
