= Mayuravarma =

Founder of Kadamba dynasty (ruled 345 to 365)

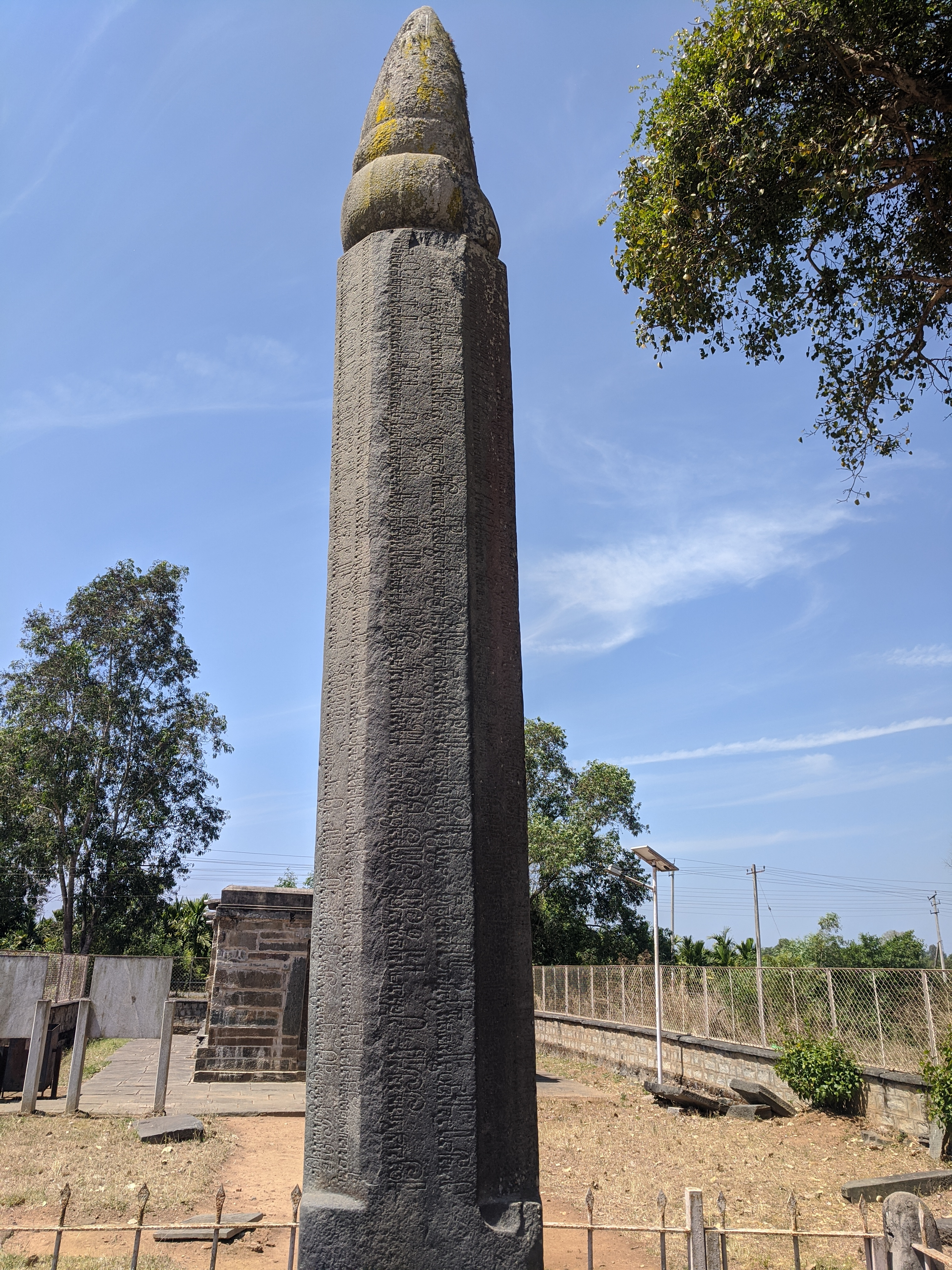
- The Talagunda pillar inscription of about c.455 CE provides insights into the life of Mayurasharma and the Kadamba lineage.

Kadamba king
- Reign: c. 345 – c. 365
- Successor: Kangavarma
- Dynasty: Kadamba

Mayuravarma, spelled Mayurasharma by modern scholars (reigned 345–365 CE), a native of Talagunda (in modern Shimoga district), was the founder of the Kadamba kingdom of Banavasi, the earliest native kingdom to rule over what is today the modern state of Karnataka, India. Before the rise of the Kadambas, the centres of power ruling the land were outside the Karnataka region; thus the Kadambas' ascent to power as an independent geo-political entity, with Kannada, the language of the soil as a major regional language, is a landmark event in the history of modern Karnataka with Mayuravarman as an important historical figure. The earliest Kannada language inscriptions are attributed to the Kadambas of Banavasi.

== Early life ==
The Talagunda inscription of 450 is considered the most reliable source of information about the family of Mayurasharma and the origin of the kingdom. The inscription is known to be free of legends, giving a realistic and true account of the Kadamba line of kings. He was the son of Bandhushena, grandson of his guru (teacher) Veerasharma and a student at the Agrahara (place of learning) in Talagunda. The inscription confirms the family is named for the Kadamba tree that grew near the family home. The Gudnapur inscription further confirms Mayurasharma's parentage and that he acquired the character of a Kshatriya.

=== Legends ===
There are several legends and tales that describe the progeny of the Kadamba family. According to legend tale, Mayuravarma was born to the sister of a Jain Muni under a Kadamba tree. It appears that all these legends evolved so as to present the founder of the kingdom as a demi-god. Another legend states the family descended from a three-eyed, four-armed being called Trilochana Kadamba who sprang to life from the drops of sweat from the forehead of Shiva falling at the roots of a Kadamba tree. Another legend states Mayurasharma was born of Rudra (a form a Shiva) and the mother earth under an auspicious Kadamba tree and that he was born with a third eye on his forehead.

Ediga community in india worship kadamba tree as there devote tree, Edgar thurston mention in his book, the main goddes of this community was yellamma who later blessed in this tree.so Ediga community in india have strong historical link to kadamba tree

== Rise of the kingdom ==
According to the Talagunda inscription, Mayurasharma went to Kanchi the capital of the Pallavas to pursue his Vedic studies accompanied by his guru and grandfather Veerasharma. Kanchi was an important Ghatikasthana (centre of learning) at that time. There, having been humiliated by a Pallava guard (horseman), in a rage Mayurasharma gave up his Brahminic studies and took to the sword to avenge his insult. The inscription vividly describes the event thus:

That the hand dextrous in grasping the kusha grass, fuel and stones, ladle, melted butter and the oblation vessel, unsheathed a flaming sword, eager to conquer the earth

It can be said that the rise of Mayurasharma against the Pallava hold over the Talagunda region was actually a successful rebellion of Brahmins against the domination of the Kshatriya power as wielded by the Pallavas of Kanchi. Thus was born, in a moment of righteous indignation, the first kingdom native to present day Karnataka region. Other scholars however feel Mayurasharma's rebellion was well timed to coincide with the defeat of Pallava Vishnugopa by the southern invasion of Samudragupta of northern India. Mayurasharma first succeeded in establishing himself in the forests of Shriparvata (possibly modern Srisailam in Andhra Pradesh) by defeating the Antharapalas (guards) of the Pallavas and subduing the Banas of Kolar. The Pallavas under Skandavarman were unable to contain Mayurasharma and recognised him as a sovereign in the regions from the Amara ocean (western ocean) to Prehara (Malaprabha River). Some historians feel that Mayurasharma was initially appointed as a commander (dandanayaka) in the army of the Pallavas, as the inscription uses such terms as Senani and calls Mayurasharma Shadanana (six-faced god of war). However, after a period of time, availing himself of the confusion caused by the defeat of Pallava Vishnugopa by Samudragupta (from the Allahabad inscriptions), Mayurasharma carved out a kingdom with Banavasi (near Talagunda) as his capital. It is also known that in other battles, Mayurasharma defeated the Traikutas, Abhiras, Sendrakas, Pallavas, Pariyathrakas, Shakasthana, the Maukharis and Punnatas. To celebrate his successes, Mayurasharma performed many horse sacrifices and granted 144 villages (known as brahmadeyas) to Brahmins of Talagunda. With an effort to rejuvenate the ancient Brahminic faith and to perform the royal rituals and the related functions of the government, Mayurasharma invited learned Vaidika Brahmins from Ahichatra. The Havyaka Brahmins claim descent from these early Brahmin settlers of the 4th century called the Ahichatra Brahmins or the Ahikaru/Havikaru.

== In popular media ==
- Mayurasharma was the protagonist in the 1975 Kannada film Mayura starring Rajkumar. The story is a depiction of the early years of conflict with the Pallava rulers and Mayurasharma's eventual ascension to the Kadamba throne.
- Literature : The famous Telugu writer, poet and scholar, a Jnanapeeth recipient, Padmabushan Visawanatha Satyanarayana wrote the story of Mayura Sharma as a novel named 'Kadimi Chettu ' (Literal translation: The Kadamba Tree) in Telugu.

== Descendants ==
the Kadambas of Goa were descendants of Mayuravarman, the founder of the original Kadamba kingdom. Mayuravarman established the Kadamba dynasty around 345 CE in Banavasi, and the Goan branch, founded by Kadamba Shasthadeva around 960 CE, was a subordinate to the larger dynasty and its later rulers. The lineage is confirmed by the Talagunda inscription.
