= Talagunda =

- village
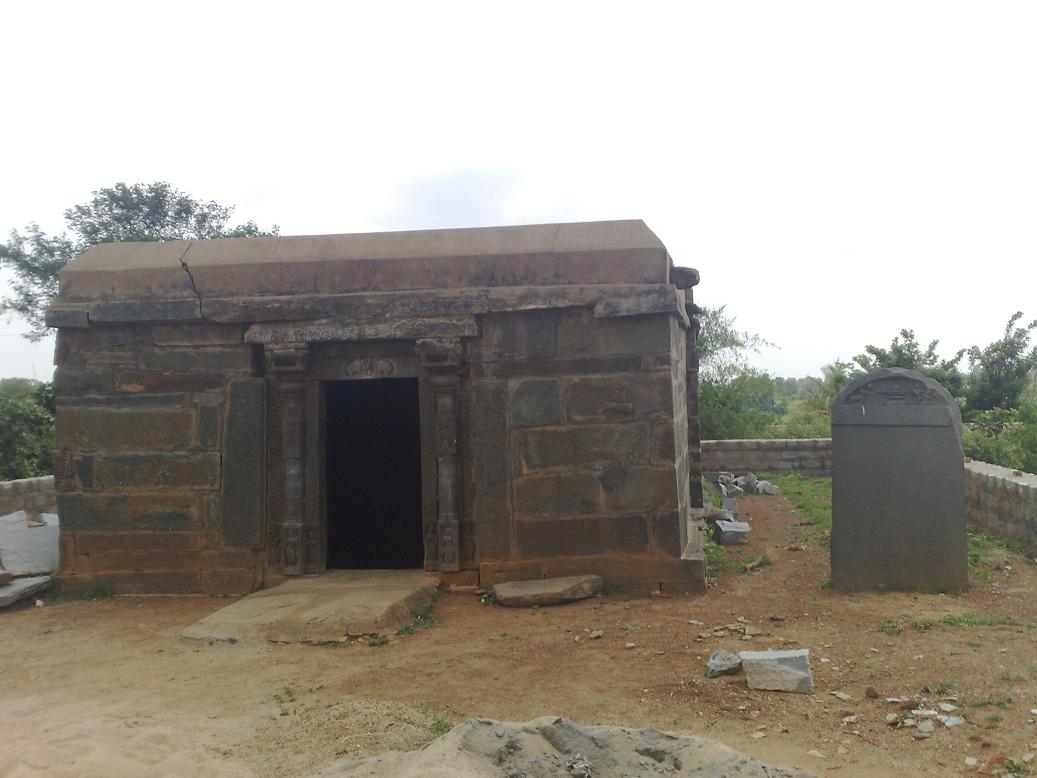
- Pranaveshwara Temple (4th century) at Talagunda

- Location in Karnataka, India
- Coordinates: 14.42°N 75.26°E
- Country: India
- State: Karnataka
- District: Shimoga District

Languages
  - Official: Kannada
- Time zone: UTC+5:30 (IST)
- PIN: 577 450
- Telephone code: 08187
- Vehicle registration: KA-14

Talagunda is a village in the Shikaripura taluk of Shivamogga district in the state of Karnataka, India. Many inscriptions found here have provided insights into the rise of the Kadamba Dynasty.

== History ==
Talagunda was earlier known as Sthanakunduru and it was an agrahara (a place of learning- ಶಿಕ್ಷಣ ಕೇಂದ್ರ). This is the earliest known agrahara found in Karnataka. Built at the time of Gouthamiputa Shathakarni (ಗೌತಮಿಪುತ್ರ ಶಾತಕರ್ಣಿ). An inscription found at Talagunda indicates that Kanchi was a major centre (ghatika) for learning, especially of the vedas taught by learned brahmanas. It indicates that 32 Brahmins were relocated from a place called Ahi-kshetra to Sthanagundur by Mukanna (or Trinetra), thereby creating an agrahara.. Mukanna was an ancestor of Mayurasharma, the founder of the Kadamba Dynasty. The word Ahi means snake or Naga in Sanskrit. Nagas were a group of ancient people who worshiped serpents. The word khsetra means region in Sanskrit. This implies that Ahi-kshetra was a region of Nagas. This could mean that the region was populated originally by Nagas, Nairs, Bunts of Kerala and Tulu Nadu who claim Kshatriya descent from the nagas trace their origins to this place. and historically and traditionally, Balligavi and Talagunda are recorded as important Jain centres and significant places of learning.

Education was imparted at Talagunda for eight centuries and the subjects that were taught included vedas, vedanta, grammar and philosophy. The Kannada language was taught at primary level and clothing and food was provided to the students and teachers.

== Inscriptions ==
A temple dedicated to Pranaveshwara (Hindu God Shiva) is located in Talagunda. Next to it is located a stone slab containing inscriptions. In front of it is a pillar containing inscriptions in Sanskrit. The pillar inscriptions were written in the mid 5th century CE during the reign of Śāntivarman (a descendant of Mayurasharma). The author of this inscription was Kubja, the court-poet of Śāntivarman. He engraved the inscriptions himself to prevent any other engraver from committing mistakes.

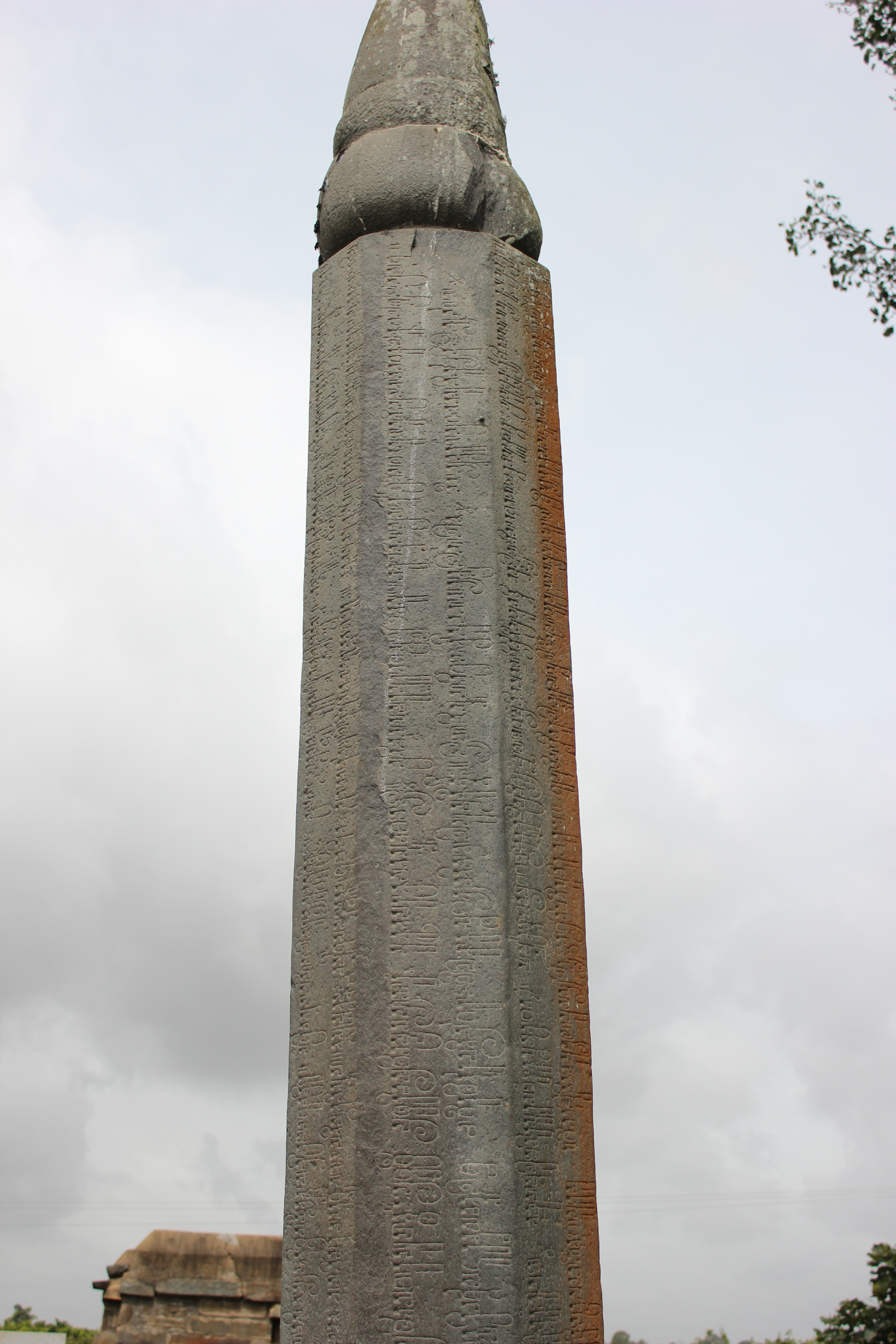
The famous Talagunda pillar inscription (450-460 A.D) that details the rise of the Kadamba Dynasty.

Kubja, describes these inscriptions as a kavya thus:

In deference to the command of King Santivarman,
Kubja has written this, his own kavya,
upon the face of this rock

The inscriptions indicate that Mayurasharma, native of Talagunda, was accomplished in vaidika and went to the Pallava capital, Kanchipuram to study scriptures, accompanied by his guru and grandfather Veerasharama. There, having been humiliated by a Pallava guard (horseman), in a rage Mayurasharma gave up his Brahminic studies and took to the sword to avenge his insult. The inscription vividly describes the event thus:

That the hand dextrous in grasping the kusha grass, fuel and stones, ladle, melted butter and the oblation vessel, unsheathed a flaming sword, eager to conquer the earth

The inscriptions thus describe Kadambas as Brahmins turned conquerors and praise Brahmins as "Gods on earth, and speakers of Sama, Rig and Yajur Vedas". The Kadamba lineage is described as descending from a three-sage line in the Hariti pravara and belonging to the Manavya gothra.

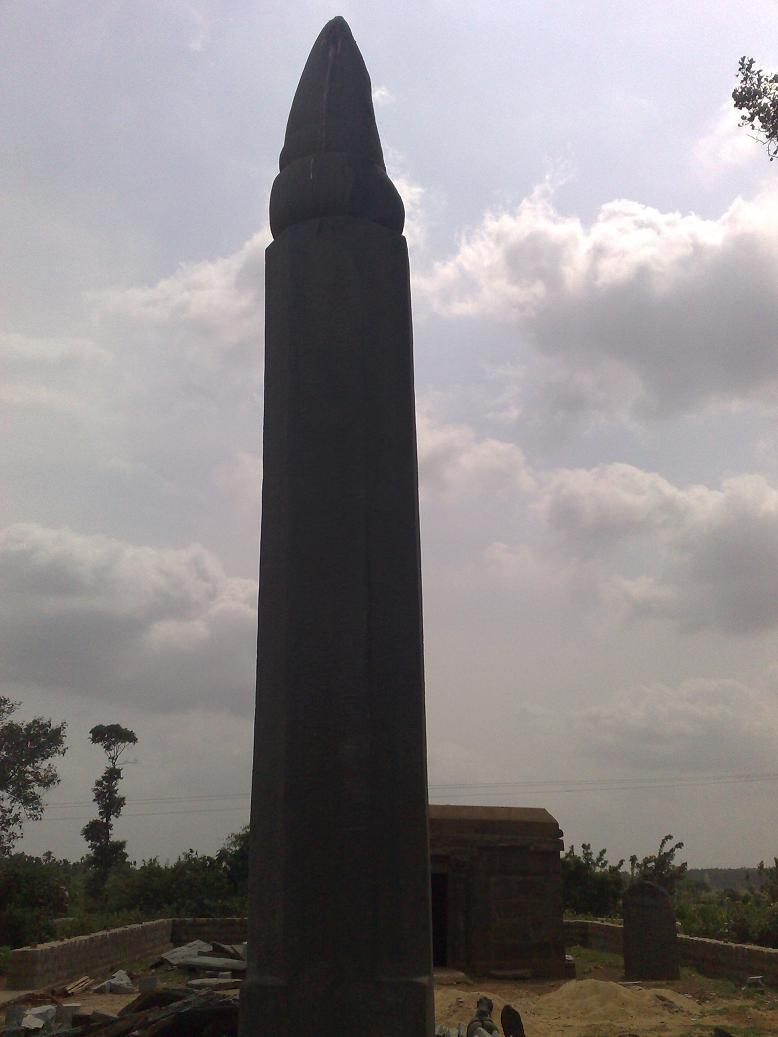
A view of the Talagunda pillar
