= Santivarma =

- Dharmamahārājadhirāja

King of the Kadamba Kingdom
- Reign: c. 450 - 460 CE
- Predecessor: Kakusthavarma
- Successor: Shivamandhatruvarma
- Issue: Mrigeshavarma
- House: Kadamba
- Father: Kakusthavarma

Santivarma (c. 455) was known for his personal charm and beauty.

== Life ==
Santivarma was born to Kakusthavarma. His son was Mrigeshavarma. His name is mentioned in Talagunda pillar inscription and in an inscription of Vishnuvarma. According to an inscription he wore three crowns (pattatraya) to display his prosperity, thus "attracting the attention of his enemies", the Pallavas. When the Pallava threat loomed, he divided his kingdom in c. 455 and let his younger brother Krishnavarma I rule over the southern portion and deal with the Pallavas. The branch is called the Triparvata branch and ruled from either Devagiri in the modern Dharwad district or Halebidu.
