= George M. Moraes =

Indian historian and author (1905–1994)

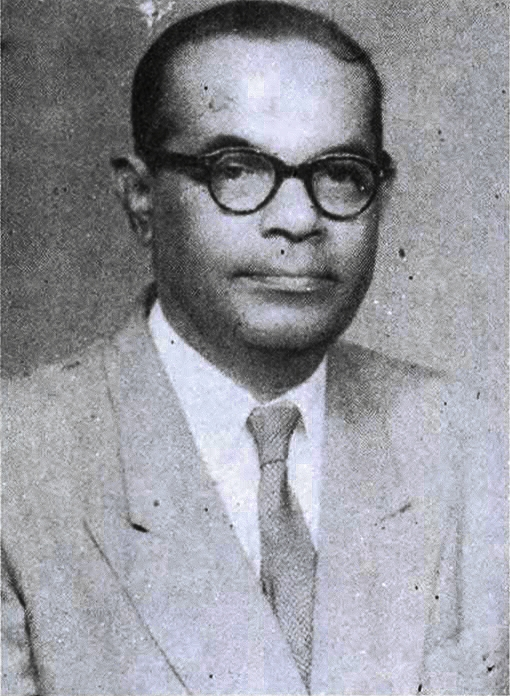
- Portrait of Moraes
- Born: George Mark Moraes; 11 May 1905; Cuncolim, Goa, Portuguese India
- Died: 16 April 1994 (aged 88)
- Education: Doctor of Philosophy in English
- Occupations: Historian; writer; professor
- Years active: 1927–1994
- Employers: St. Xavier's College; Royal Asiatic Society; Indian Historical Research Commission
- Notable work: The Kadamba Kula: A History of Ancient and Mediaeval Karnataka (1931)

George Mark Moraes (11 May 1905 – 16 April 1994), known by his pen name George M. Moraes, was an Indian historian, writer, and professor. He has over 29 historical and research works to his name which were published in 74 publications and 542 library holdings. He is considered as one of the greatest Goan intellectuals and historians. Moraes is best known for his book, The Kadamba Kula: A History of Ancient and Mediaeval Karnataka (1931).

== Early life ==
George Mark Moraes was born on 11 May 1905 at Bencleamvaddo (ward) at Cuncolim, Portuguese India during the Portuguese Empire (now part of India). He had completed his Doctor of Philosophy (Ph.D) in English.

== Career ==
Moraes was a professor of history at St. Xavier's College, Mumbai. His book, The Kadamba Kula (1931) is his research on the Kadamba dynasty. According to Google Books, his work was chosen by the scholars for being culturally important and is now part of the conceptualisation of civilization. He has also authored books like History of Christians in India, Historiography of Indian Languages, and many others, published in several editions. Moraes was also employed in institutions like the Royal Asiatic Society and the Indian Historical Research Commission.

== Legacy ==
Some locals attempted to set up a library in honour of Moraes, and on 18 July 2020, they demanded that the newly constructed Goa State Urban Development Agency (GSUDA) building be named after him.

== 2020 heritage house incident ==
On 17 July 2020, Moraes's heritage house at Bencleamvaddo, Cuncolim, collapsed due to continuous rains. The house had been in a poor condition for many years, and its state had worsened over time. The ceiling of the house had already crumbled during the monsoons in 2019, and the remainder of the house fell apart.

Prior to the crumbling of the house, the distant relatives of Moraes were in the process of claiming ownership of the property to sell it. However, the locals of Cuncolim appealed to the Cuncolim Municipal Council to acquire the land and the heritage house to build a children's park in Moraes's memory. The locals then questioned why the state administration and local government had not taken any initiative to preserve Moraes's home as a historical heritage site.
