= Kadamba =

Kadamba is a Sanskrit word meaning dove and may refer to:

== Dynasties ==
- Kadamba dynasty (disambiguation)
  - Kadamba dynasty (345–525 CE)
  - Kadambas of Hangal (980–1031 CE); include the minor kingdoms of Bankapur, Bayalnad, Nagarkhanda and Uchchangi
  - Kadambas of Goa (10th to the 14th century CE)
  - Kadambas of Halasi (founded by Mayurasharma in about 4th century AD)
  - Kadambas of Bayalnadu (Vainadu)
  - Kadambas of Belur
  - Kadambas of Bankapura
  - Kadambas of Uchchangi
  - Kadambas of Nagarkhanda
  - Kadambas of Kalinga

== Films ==
- Kadamba (1983 film)
- Kadamba (2004 film)

== People ==
- Kadamba Kanana Swami, an ISKCON guru
- Kadamba Simmons, a British actress and model

== Other ==
- Kadamba architecture
- Kadamba script
- Kadamba tree
- Kadamba Transport Corporation, a state owned transport company (Goa)
- INS Kadamba, a new base of the Indian Navy

== See also ==
- Kadamban
- Kadambar
- Kadambari (disambiguation)
- Kadambas, Nepal
