= Kadamba dynasty (disambiguation) =

The Kadamba dynasty of Banavasi ruled parts of south-western India between 4th and 6th centuries. Other dynasties with this name include:

- Kadambas of Halasi
- Kadambas of Hangal
- Kadambas of Goa
- Kadambas of Halasi
- Kadambas of Bayalnadu (Vainadu)
- Kadambas of Belur
- Kadambas of Bankapura
- Kadambas of Uchchangi
- Kadambas of Nagarkhanda
- Kadambas of Kalinga

== See also ==
- Kadamba (disambiguation)
