= Pagoda (coin) =

Gold coin formerly used for trade in India

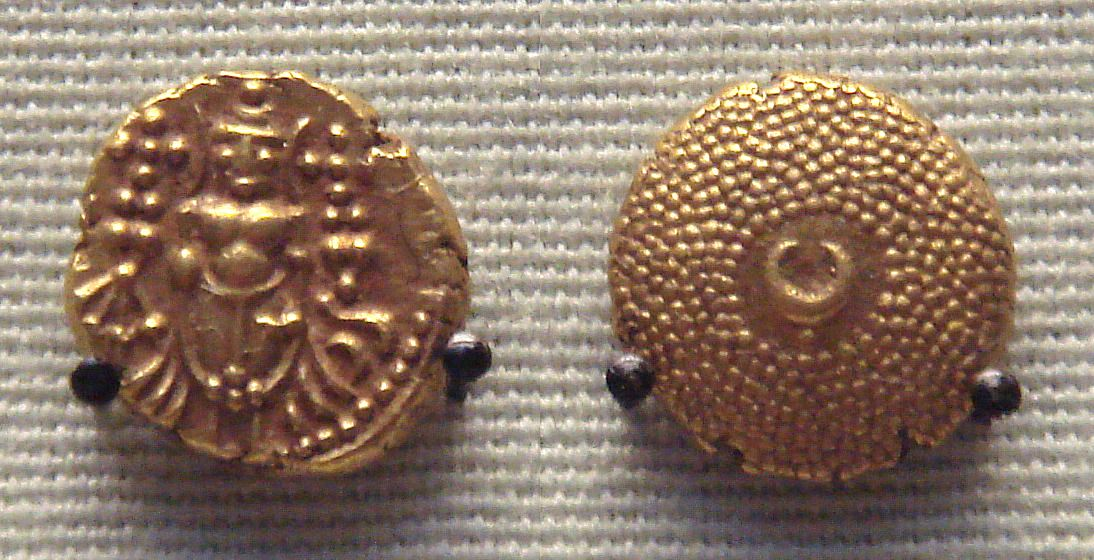
French Indies Company-issued "Gold Pagoda" for Southern India trade, cast in Pondicherry 1705–1780.

The pagoda, officially called as the Pratapa, was a unit of currency, a coin made of gold or half-gold minted by Indian dynasties as well as the British, the French and the Dutch. It was subdivided into 42 fanams. The pagoda was issued by various dynasties in medieval southern India, including the Kadambas of Hangal, the Kadambas of Goa, and the Vijayanagara Empire.

There were two types of pagoda coined by foreign traders:

- The most valuable was the star pagoda, 100 of them were worth 350 rupees, issued by the English East India Company at Chennai. A star pagoda weighed 3g (of gold).
- The second was the Porto Novo pagoda, issued by the Dutch at Thoothukudi and also by the Nawabs of Arcot, and worth about 25% less than the star pagoda.

The French struck local gold "pagodas" and silver "fanams" under contract by the nawabs. The silver coins of the French were called "fanon" which were equivalent to the local "fanam" and could be exchanged at the rate of 26 fanon to one gold pagoda. The local Indian rulers paid their arrears to the French, English and other European East India Companies in Pagodas, such as Veerapandya Kattabomman, who almost cleared all the revenue arrears of his Panchalankurichi Palayam, leaving only a balance of 1080 Pagodas to the English East India Company before the Palayakararar Wars against the English East India Company began.

== See also ==
- Madras fanam
- Travancore Fanam
- Coinage of Asia
