= Kadambas of Halasi =

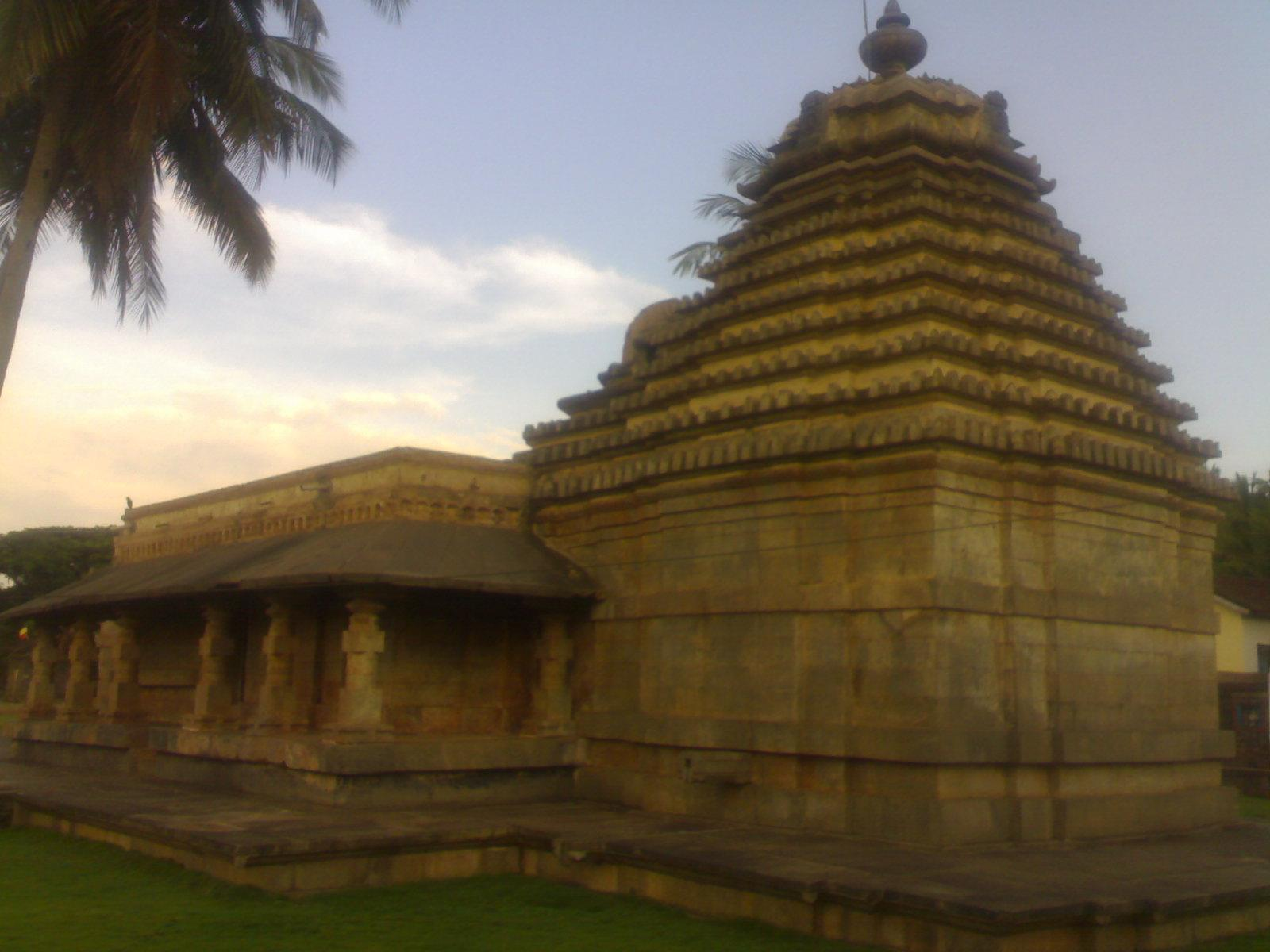
Bhuvaraha Narasimha temple Halasi, Karnataka

Location of the Kadambas, and neighbouring South Asian polities in 1175, on the eve of the Ghurid invasions of the subcontinent.
The various centers of the Kadambas

The Kadambas of Halasi was a South Indian dynasty during the Late Classical period on the Indian subcontinent, which originated in the region of Halasi, Karnataka; who were known for their own style of temple building. The Kadamba dynasty was founded by Mayurasharma in about 4th century AD. It was believed that Mayura was the first king of the dynasty and was the ruler during the time of Pallava King Vishnugopa of Kanchipuram. After losing to North Indian Emperor Samudragupta, Vishnugopa’s army had weakened. Mayura seized the opportunity, formed his own army and drove away the Pallavas from Kannada territory. On reaching Chandravalli (near Chitradurga), Mayura took shelter in a cave and founded his own dynasty. Banavasi, near Sirsi, was their first capital and their rule extended to Gomantak or present day Goa.

Kadambas of Halasi Follower of Jainism.

Halasi (Halsi or Halshi) is one of the ancient towns in Belgaum district. It was Second capital of early Kadambas and a minor capital (during 980 AD - 1250 AD) under later Kadambas. where there are Bhoo Varaha Narasimha temple, Suvarneshwara temple, Kapileshwar temple, Hatakeshwara temple, Kalmeshwara temple, Gokarneshwara temple and a Jain basadi built by the Kadamba rulers.

Halasi was a centre of confluence of Jainism during early Kadambas. It was headquarters of Halasige-12,000 province including parts of Belgaum District, Dharwad District and Haveri District.

Kadambas ruled Goa, Halasi as Capital.

== Halasi Inscriptions ==
Full scale excavations at Halasi and Gudnapur are bound to yield the brick temples of this early period. That would, show the contribution of the Kadambas of Banavasi to the Jaina architecture of Karnataka. The existence of Jaina temples during the period of the Banavasi Kadambas is amply evidenced by their epigraphs.

All the inscriptions mention gifts for worship and repair to Jaina temples. However, many of them refer to a Jaina temple at Halasi. The Jaina temple now standing at Halasi can be dated from no earlier than the 11th century A.D. As to the basadis referred to in the inscriptions, perhaps they might have been built of perishable wood.

The earliest references to a grant by a Kadamba king to a Jaina saint is found in the Halasi copper plate of Kakusthavarma. It mentions that the granted village Khatagrama belonged to arhanta. However, a reference to a Jain temple (Chaityalaya) is found in the Devagiri copper plate of Mrigesavarma. The inscription states that Mrigesavarma gave a grant for the sammarjana, upalepana, archana and bhagnasamskara of the Chaityalaya located at Brihatparalur. Further he also donated for the enclosure of the Chaityalaya one nivartana of land. This clearly shows that the above Chaityalaya was big enough to have an enclosure also. In the Devagiri inscription of Vijaya Siva Mrigesavarma a reference is made to arhat sale where an image of Jinendra was kept. Mrigesavarma's Halasi inscription of 8th regnal year states that the king built a Jinalaya in memory of his father in Palasika and granted lands to saints of Yapaniya, nirgrantha and kurchaka sangha. Ravivarma's eleventh regnal year inscription found at Halasi refers to a grant for the abhisheka of Jinendra. Obviously this refers to a Jaina temple. Another inscription of the same king refers to the worship of Jinendra for which four nivartanas of land was granted .

The Halasi inscription of Ravivarma refers to interesting information. It states that the income from the gifted village should be used for eight-day festival in Kartikamasa in the Jinalaya at Palasikanagara. It states at the end wherever Jinendra worship takes place properly, that place will prosper without any fear from enemies and the prowess of the king will improve. The Devagiri plates of prince Devavarma refers to gifts for the worship in the Chaityalaya and for the repairs of the Chaityalaya.

The famous Gudnapur inscription of Ravivarman is more explicit on this point. According to this inscription King Ravivarma built a temple, Kamajinalaya for Manmatha, very near the palace (rajavesma) and arranged for its worship by granting lands. At the same time he also gave grants to Kamajinalaya at Hakinipalli and Padmavati temple at Kalliligrama.

According to Dr. B.R. Gopal who has edited this inscription has suggested that this Kamajinalaya is a temple for Bahubali, as Bahubali is described as Manmatha. If this is so, the tradition of erecting gommata sculptures dates from the period of Kadambas and to sixth century A.D.

Dr. A. Sundara has discovered a sculpture of Rati and Manmatha at the same place. Whether this was the sculpture worshipped in the Kamajinalya is uncertain. What is more important is the tradition of building Jaina temples for Manmatha and Padmavati.

According to A. Sundara's field work at Halasi throws very important light on this point. Very close to the Kallesvara temple at Halasi, he discovered an ancient site dates from the megalithic and early historic periods. A large number of brick walls of the ancient period have been noticed by him in and around and he thinks that this represents the Jaina temple built during the Kadamba period.

In the Mrigesavarman of Kadambas of Palasika (AD 475-490) inscription mention about Yapaniya.

Timeline and cultural period	Indus plain (Punjab-Sapta Sindhu-Gujarat)	Gangetic Plain			Central India	Southern India
Timeline and cultural period	Indus plain (Punjab-Sapta Sindhu-Gujarat)	Upper Gangetic Plain (Ganga-Yamuna doab)	Middle Gangetic Plain	Lower Gangetic Plain	Central India	Southern India
IRON AGE
Culture	Late Vedic Period	Late Vedic Period; Painted Grey Ware culture	Late Vedic Period; Northern Black Polished Ware		Pre-history	
6th century BCE	Gandhara	Kuru-Panchala	Magadha		Adivasi (tribes)	Assaka
Culture	Persian-Greek influences	"Second Urbanisation"; Rise of Shramana movements Jainism - Buddhism - Ājīvika - Yoga			Pre-history	
5th century BCE	(Persian conquests)		Shaishunaga dynasty		Adivasi (tribes)	Assaka
4th century BCE	(Greek conquests)	Nanda empire				
HISTORICAL AGE
Culture	Spread of Buddhism				Pre-history	
3rd century BCE	Maurya Empire					Satavahana dynasty Sangam period (300 BCE – 200 CE); Early Cholas; Early Pandyan kingdom Cheras
Culture	Preclassical Hinduism (Note: Michaels (2004) p.39) - "Hindu Synthesis" (Note: Hiltebeitel (2002)) (ca. 200 BCE - 300 CE) (Note: Michaels (2004) p.39) (Note: Hiltebeitel (2002)); Epics - Puranas - Ramayana - Mahabharata - Bhagavad Gita - Brahma Sutras - Smarta Tradition; Mahayana Buddhism					
2nd century BCE	Indo-Greek Kingdom		Shunga Empire; Maha-Meghavahana Dynasty			Satavahana dynasty Sangam period (300 BCE – 200 CE); Early Cholas; Early Pandyan kingdom Cheras
1st century BCE	Indo-Greek Kingdom		Shunga Empire; Maha-Meghavahana Dynasty			Satavahana dynasty Sangam period (300 BCE – 200 CE); Early Cholas; Early Pandyan kingdom Cheras
1st century CE	Indo-Scythians; Indo-Parthians		Kuninda Kingdom			Satavahana dynasty Sangam period (300 BCE – 200 CE); Early Cholas; Early Pandyan kingdom Cheras
2nd century	Kushan Empire					Satavahana dynasty Sangam period (300 BCE – 200 CE); Early Cholas; Early Pandyan kingdom Cheras
3rd century	Kushano-Sasanian Kingdom; Western Satraps	Kushan Empire		Kamarupa kingdom	Adivasi (tribes)	Satavahana dynasty Sangam period (300 BCE – 200 CE); Early Cholas; Early Pandyan kingdom Cheras
Culture	"Golden Age of Hinduism"(ca. CE 320-650) (Note: Michaels (2004) p.40); Puranas - Kural; Co-existence of Hinduism and Buddhism					
4th century	Kidarites	Gupta Empire; Varman dynasty				Andhra Ikshvakus; Kalabhra dynasty Kadamba Dynasty; Western Ganga Dynasty
5th century	Hephthalite Empire	Alchon Huns				Vishnukundina; Kalabhra dynasty
6th century	Nezak Huns; Kabul Shahi; Maitraka				Adivasi (tribes)	Vishnukundina; Badami Chalukyas; Kalabhra dynasty
Culture	Late-Classical Hinduism (ca. CE 650-1100) (Note: Michaels (2004) p.41); Advaita Vedanta - Tantra; Decline of Buddhism in India					
7th century	Indo-Sassanids		Vakataka dynasty Empire of Harsha	Mlechchha dynasty	Adivasi (tribes)	Badami Chalukyas; Eastern Chalukyas; Pandyan kingdom (revival); Pallava
7th century	Karkota dynasty				Adivasi (tribes)	
8th century	Kabul Shahi	Pala Empire			Adivasi (tribes)	Eastern Chalukyas; Pandyan kingdom Kalachuri
9th century	Gurjara-Pratihara				Adivasi (tribes)	Rashtrakuta Empire; Eastern Chalukyas; Pandyan kingdom Medieval Cholas; Chera Perumals of Makkotai
10th century	Ghaznavids			Pala dynasty Kamboja-Pala dynasty	Adivasi (tribes)	Kalyani Chalukyas; Eastern Chalukyas; Medieval Cholas; Chera Perumals of Makkotai; Rashtrakuta
References and sources for table References Sources: Flood, Gavin D. (1996), An Introduction to Hinduism, Cambridge University Press; Hiltebeitel, Alf (2002), Hinduism. In: Joseph Kitagawa, "The Religious Traditions of Asia: Religion, History, and Culture", Routledge; Michaels, Axel (2004), Hinduism. Past and present, Princeton, New Jersey: Princeton University Press

== See also ==
- Kadamba of Hangal
- Kadamba architecture
- Kadambas of Goa
- Jainism in North Karnataka
- Kadambas of Bayalnadu (Vainadu)
