= Kadambas of Hangal =

Ruling dynasty of Karnataka from 980–1031 CE

- 10th century CE – 14th century CE
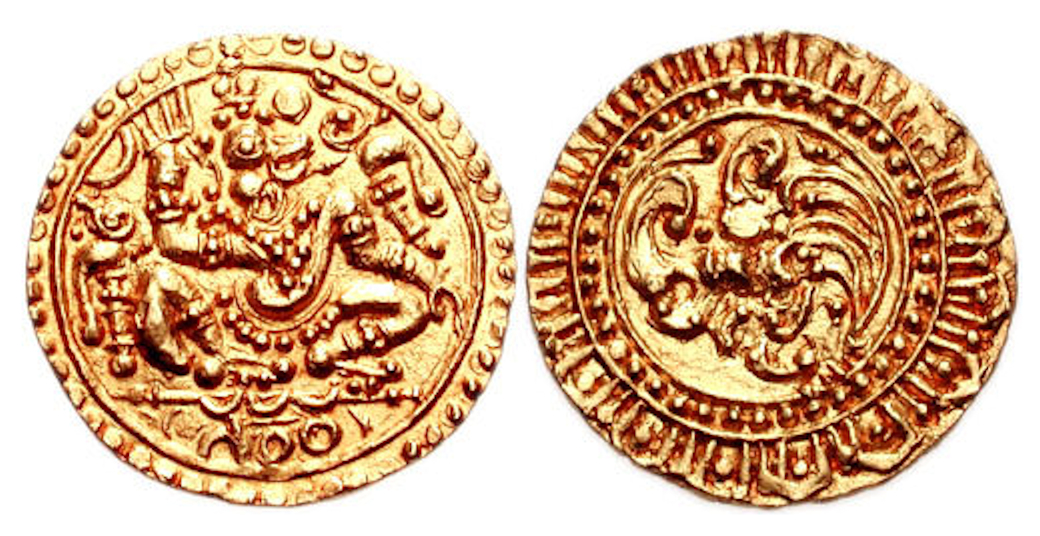
- Coinage of the Kadambas of Hangal (c. 12th–13th century). Obverse with a depiction of Hanuman, reverse with floral spray.

- Location of the Kadambas, and neighbouring South Asian polities in 1175, on the eve of the Ghurid invasions of the subcontinent.
- Government: Monarchy
- Historical era: Medieval India
  - Established: 10th century CE
  - Disestablished: 14th century CE
- Today part of: India

The Kadambas of Hangal was a South Indian dynasty during the Late Classical period on the Indian subcontinent, which originated in the region of Hangal in Karnataka. Chatta Deva who reigned from 980–1031 CE founded the dynasty. He helped Western Chalukyas in the coup against the Rashtrakutas; re-established the Kadamba Dynasty mostly as a feudatory of Western Chalukyas, but his successors enjoyed considerable independence and were almost sovereign rulers of Goa and Konkan till 14th century CE.

The successors of Chatta Deva occupied both Banavasi and Hangal and are known as Kadambas of Hangal. Uniting Banavasi and Hangal, distinguished himself against the Cholas and carved out a kingdom (which stretched, on this side, including Ratnagiri district, up to Kolhapur). He is referred to as having conquered Konkan. When the Chalukyas under their king, Jayasimha II made an advance on Dhar (capital of the Malavas) and defeated Bhoja, who was then the Paramara king, the part played by Chaltadev (Chatta Deva), the feudatory of the Chalukyas, was significant. During 1075-1116 Kirtivarma subdued the 7 Konkans.

According to historian, George M. Moraes, Due to the struggle between the Hoysalas and the Yadavas, for supremacy, the Kadambas of Hangal under Kamdeva marched against the Konkan and compelled Vijayadatta (to transfer his allegiance to him). But during 1187 and 1188, immediately on his accession, Jayakesi III declared himself independent. Later Kadambas kept paying nominal allegiance to Yadavas and Hoysalas of Dorasamudra and thus maintained their independence.

Different families of Kadambas ruled southern India, notable were Kadambas of Hangal, Kadambas of Goa, Kadambas of Halasi and Kadambas of Banavasi.

== Minor Kadamba Kingdoms ==
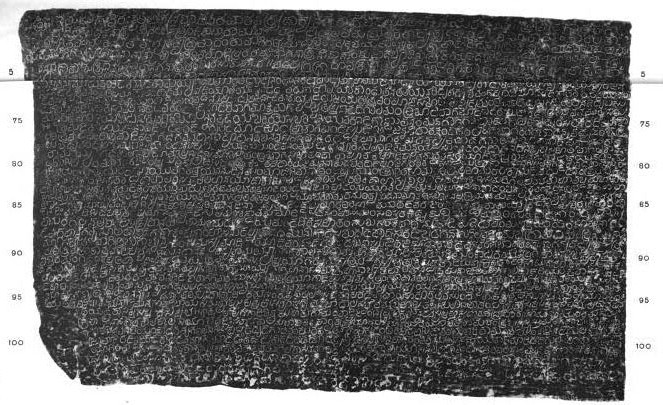
Old Kannada inscription (1200 CE) of King Kamadeva of the Kadamba dynasty of the Hangal branch.

The various centers of the Kadambas

The Kadambas of Banavasi declined by sixth century, by the tenth century Kadamba were local chiefs, the Kadamba of Hangal emerged as a vassal of the Western Chalukyas, and the Kadambas of Goa at Goa and Konkan until the fourteenth century. Similarly some more minor Kadamba branches established, they remained vassals.

=== Kadambas of Bankapur ===
They served as regional governors for Kadambas of Banavasi and then Kadambas of Hangal.

=== Kadambas of Bayalnad ===
After the fall of the Western Gangas, the Kadambas of Bayalnad established as independent kingdom. It was founded by Kaviyammarasa, who ruled towards end of 10th century CE.

=== Kadambas of Nagarkhanda ===
Kadambas of Nagarkhanda descendants of Mayuravarma of Hangal, served as regional governors, Nagarkhanda is the district to the north-east of Banavasi. They titled as boon lords of Banavasipura, their capital was at Bandhavapura. Initially the Kadambas of Hangal refused to acknowledge suzerainty of Kalachuris of Kalyani, that led to war between them, then Kalachuris helped Somadeva as per the 1159 inscription Somadeva subordinate of Kalachuris, they conquered Banavasi and handed it over to Somadeva (in 1165).

=== Kadambas of Uchchangi ===
The Kadambas of Uchchangi were in name only kings of Banavasi actually the power remain with Kadambas of Hangal.

== Coinage of Hangal Kadambas ==
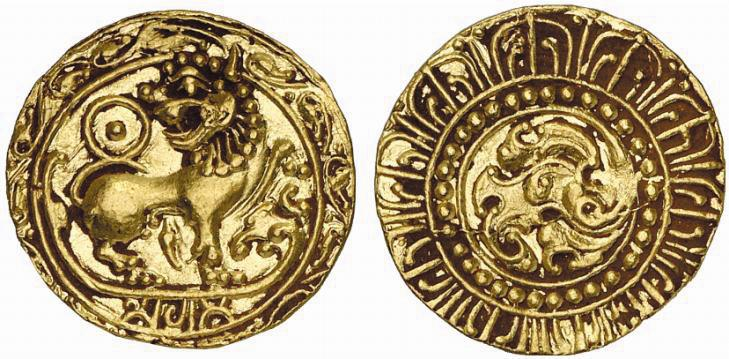
1048 - 1075 CE Gold coins issued by Kadamba King Toyimadeva.

Kadambas coins were among the heaviest and perhaps purest of all medieval Indian gold coinage. Kadambas issued 2 types of gold coins, namely Punch-marked gold coins and Die struck gold coins. During 1075-1094 CE, Shanti Varma, issued gold punch marked coin and in 1065 CE, Toyimadeva, issued die struck gold coins (Pagoda).

=== Punch-marked gold coins ===
- Kadamba punch-marked gold coin issued in name of Jaysimha II Jagadekamalla (Chalukya).
- Coin consists of a central punch mark of Hanuman, and 4 retrospectant lions.
- 2 prominent punch marks create 2 Shri alphabets depicts goddess Laxmi in Telugu-Kannada script.

=== Die struck gold coins (Pagoda) ===
- In 1065 AD Kadambas Toyimadeva issued first die struck gold coins.
- The gold coin of Kadambas depict god Hanuman, inside lined circle and dotted circle, flanked by two chouries and conch. Also include the figures of sun and moon. Below is the legend Nakara (Nagara, the deity of Bankapura, Nagareshwara) in Telugu-Kannada script.

Timeline and cultural period	Indus plain (Punjab-Sapta Sindhu-Gujarat)	Gangetic Plain			Central India	Southern India
Timeline and cultural period	Indus plain (Punjab-Sapta Sindhu-Gujarat)	Upper Gangetic Plain (Ganga-Yamuna doab)	Middle Gangetic Plain	Lower Gangetic Plain	Central India	Southern India
IRON AGE
Culture	Late Vedic Period	Late Vedic Period; Painted Grey Ware culture	Late Vedic Period; Northern Black Polished Ware		Pre-history	
6th century BCE	Gandhara	Kuru-Panchala	Magadha		Adivasi (tribes)	Assaka
Culture	Persian-Greek influences	"Second Urbanisation"; Rise of Shramana movements Jainism - Buddhism - Ājīvika - Yoga			Pre-history	
5th century BCE	(Persian conquests)		Shaishunaga dynasty		Adivasi (tribes)	Assaka
4th century BCE	(Greek conquests)	Nanda empire				
HISTORICAL AGE
Culture	Spread of Buddhism				Pre-history	
3rd century BCE	Maurya Empire					Satavahana dynasty Sangam period (300 BCE – 200 CE); Early Cholas; Early Pandyan kingdom Cheras
Culture	Preclassical Hinduism (Note: Michaels (2004) p.39) - "Hindu Synthesis" (Note: Hiltebeitel (2002)) (ca. 200 BCE - 300 CE) (Note: Michaels (2004) p.39) (Note: Hiltebeitel (2002)); Epics - Puranas - Ramayana - Mahabharata - Bhagavad Gita - Brahma Sutras - Smarta Tradition; Mahayana Buddhism					
2nd century BCE	Indo-Greek Kingdom		Shunga Empire; Maha-Meghavahana Dynasty			Satavahana dynasty Sangam period (300 BCE – 200 CE); Early Cholas; Early Pandyan kingdom Cheras
1st century BCE	Indo-Greek Kingdom		Shunga Empire; Maha-Meghavahana Dynasty			Satavahana dynasty Sangam period (300 BCE – 200 CE); Early Cholas; Early Pandyan kingdom Cheras
1st century CE	Indo-Scythians; Indo-Parthians		Kuninda Kingdom			Satavahana dynasty Sangam period (300 BCE – 200 CE); Early Cholas; Early Pandyan kingdom Cheras
2nd century	Kushan Empire					Satavahana dynasty Sangam period (300 BCE – 200 CE); Early Cholas; Early Pandyan kingdom Cheras
3rd century	Kushano-Sasanian Kingdom; Western Satraps	Kushan Empire		Kamarupa kingdom	Adivasi (tribes)	Satavahana dynasty Sangam period (300 BCE – 200 CE); Early Cholas; Early Pandyan kingdom Cheras
Culture	"Golden Age of Hinduism"(ca. CE 320-650) (Note: Michaels (2004) p.40); Puranas - Kural; Co-existence of Hinduism and Buddhism					
4th century	Kidarites	Gupta Empire; Varman dynasty				Andhra Ikshvakus; Kalabhra dynasty Kadamba Dynasty; Western Ganga Dynasty
5th century	Hephthalite Empire	Alchon Huns				Vishnukundina; Kalabhra dynasty
6th century	Nezak Huns; Kabul Shahi; Maitraka				Adivasi (tribes)	Vishnukundina; Badami Chalukyas; Kalabhra dynasty
Culture	Late-Classical Hinduism (ca. CE 650-1100) (Note: Michaels (2004) p.41); Advaita Vedanta - Tantra; Decline of Buddhism in India					
7th century	Indo-Sassanids		Vakataka dynasty Empire of Harsha	Mlechchha dynasty	Adivasi (tribes)	Badami Chalukyas; Eastern Chalukyas; Pandyan kingdom (revival); Pallava
7th century	Karkota dynasty				Adivasi (tribes)	
8th century	Kabul Shahi	Pala Empire			Adivasi (tribes)	Eastern Chalukyas; Pandyan kingdom Kalachuri
9th century	Gurjara-Pratihara				Adivasi (tribes)	Rashtrakuta Empire; Eastern Chalukyas; Pandyan kingdom Medieval Cholas; Chera Perumals of Makkotai
10th century	Ghaznavids			Pala dynasty Kamboja-Pala dynasty	Adivasi (tribes)	Kalyani Chalukyas; Eastern Chalukyas; Medieval Cholas; Chera Perumals of Makkotai; Rashtrakuta
References and sources for table References Sources: Flood, Gavin D. (1996), An Introduction to Hinduism, Cambridge University Press; Hiltebeitel, Alf (2002), Hinduism. In: Joseph Kitagawa, "The Religious Traditions of Asia: Religion, History, and Culture", Routledge; Michaels, Axel (2004), Hinduism. Past and present, Princeton, New Jersey: Princeton University Press

== See also ==
- Kadamba dynasty
- Kadambas of Goa
- Kadamba architecture
- Hangal
- Halasi
- Banavasi
- Vajjada II
- Indian coinage
- Kadambas of Bayalnadu (Vainadu)
