= Kadambari (disambiguation) =

Kadambari is a Sanskrit novel by Banabhatta. It may also refer to:

- Kadambari (1976 film), an Indian Hindi-language film
- Kadambari (2015 film), an Indian Bengali-language film by Suman Ghosh
- Kadambari Devi, sister-in-law of Rabindranath Tagore
- Kadambari Murali, an Indian sports journalist

== See also ==
- Kadamba (disambiguation)
