= Kadamba architecture =

Indian temple architecture

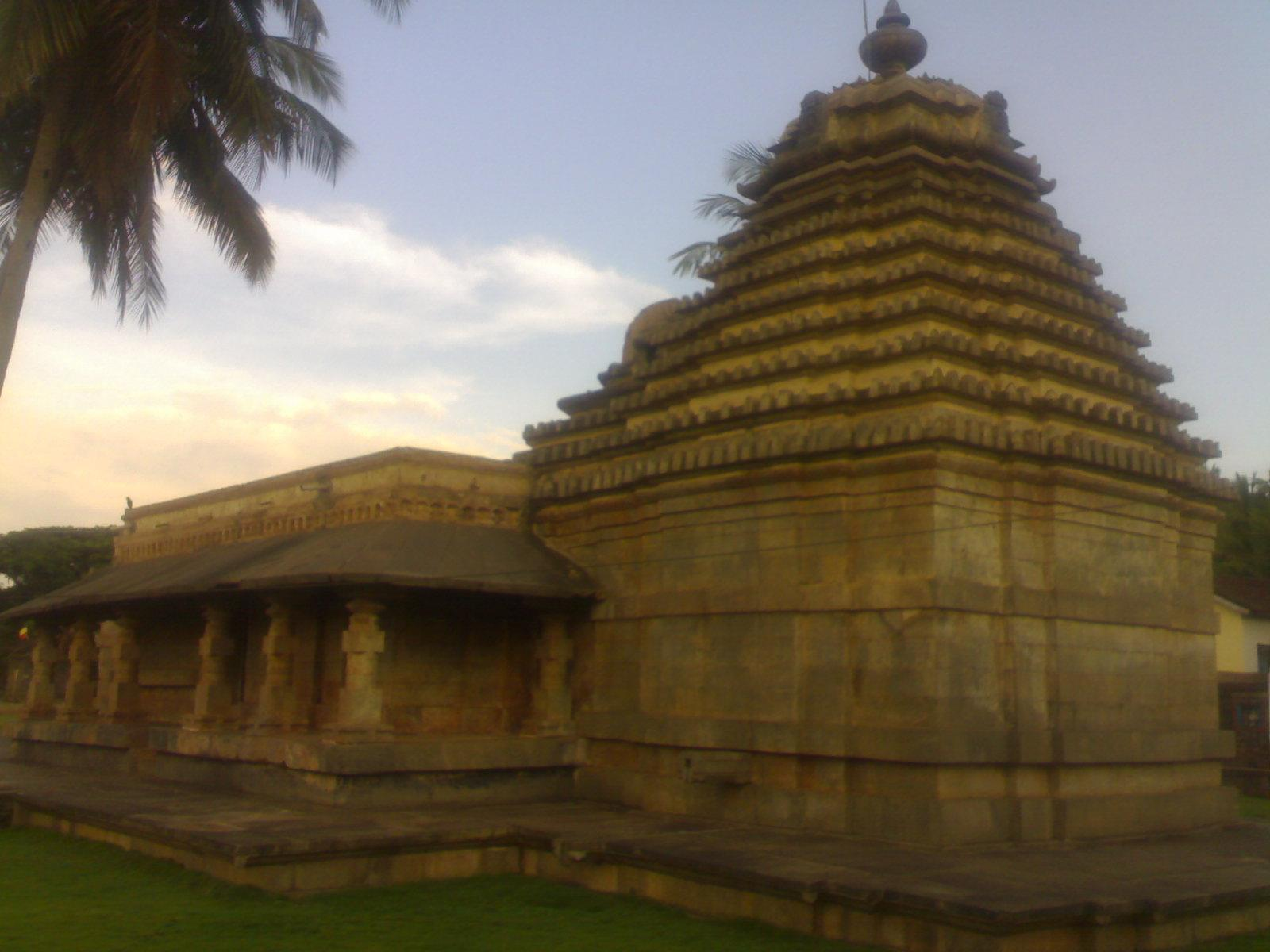
Bhuvaraha Narasimha temple Halasi, Karnataka

Kadamba architecture was a style of temple architecture founded by Mayurasharma in the 4th century AD in Karnataka, India. Kadambas created new style of architecture which was the basis of the Hoysalas style of architecture, developed original school of sculpture, was the forerunner of series of South Indian sculptors. Many temples at Aihole, Badami and Hampi are built in Kadamba style.

== History ==
During 345 AD to 525 AD, the ancient royal dynasty of Karnataka, the Kadambas made early contribution to the architecture of Karnataka and they are the originators.

== Kadamba art ==
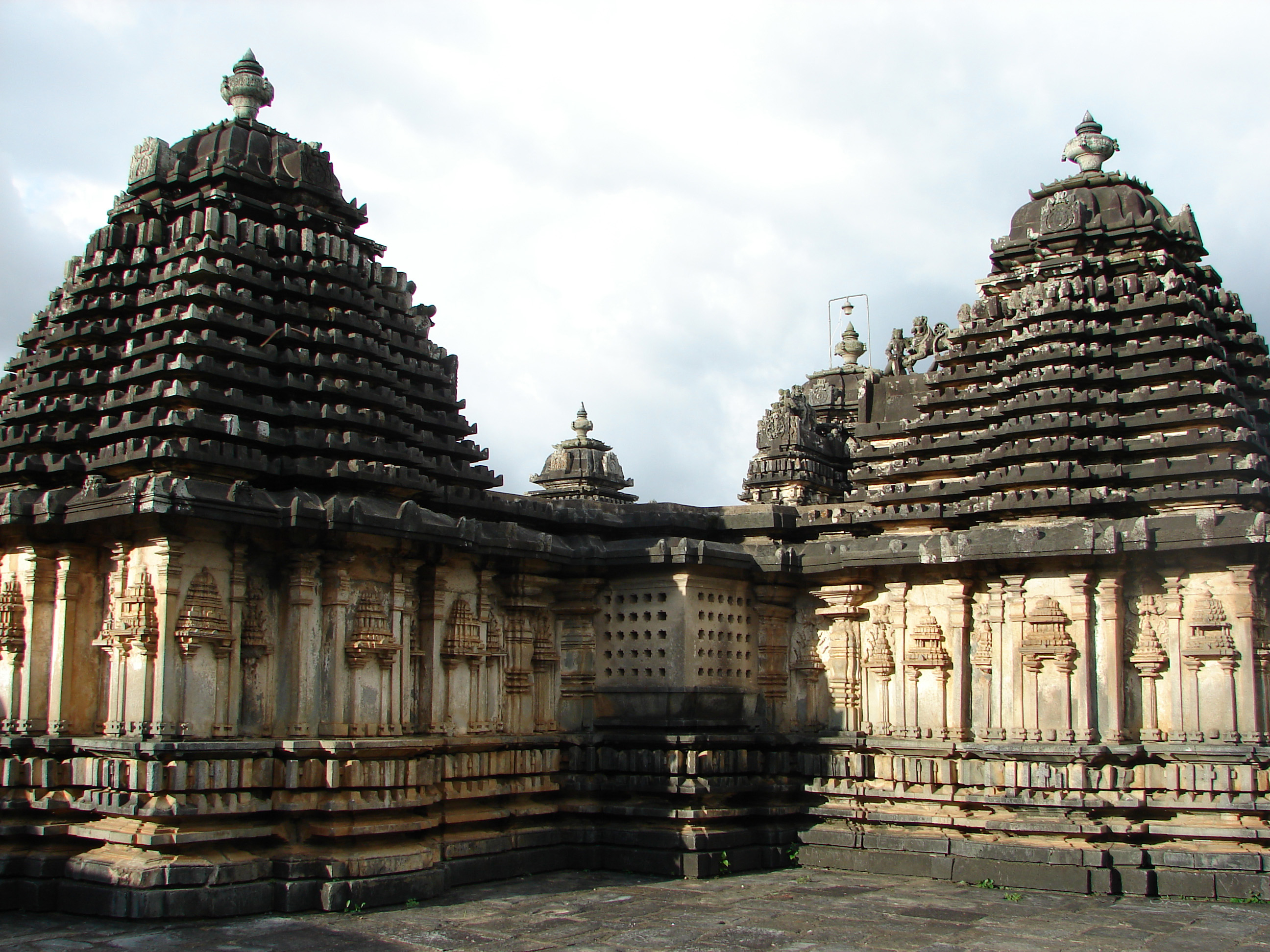
Lakshmi Devi temple, Doddagaddavalli

The most prominent feature of Kadamba architecture was Shikara called Kadamba Shikara. The tower rises in steps without any decoration (pyramid shaped shikara) with pinnacle (Stupika or Kalasha) on top. The Kadamba temples vimana usually square in plan, the tower is pyramidal shape and constitutes a series of horizontal step stages decorated with uniform series of quadrangular vertical projections and covering vestibules attached to vimana, The stages are more numerous and less elevated, devoid of pavilion ornamentation.

Kadamba's architecture and sculpture contributed to the foundation of Chalukya-Hoysala style.

- Lakshmi Devi temple, Doddagaddavalli
- Bhoo Varaha Laxmi Narasimha Temple Halasi

== Temples in Kadamba architectural style ==
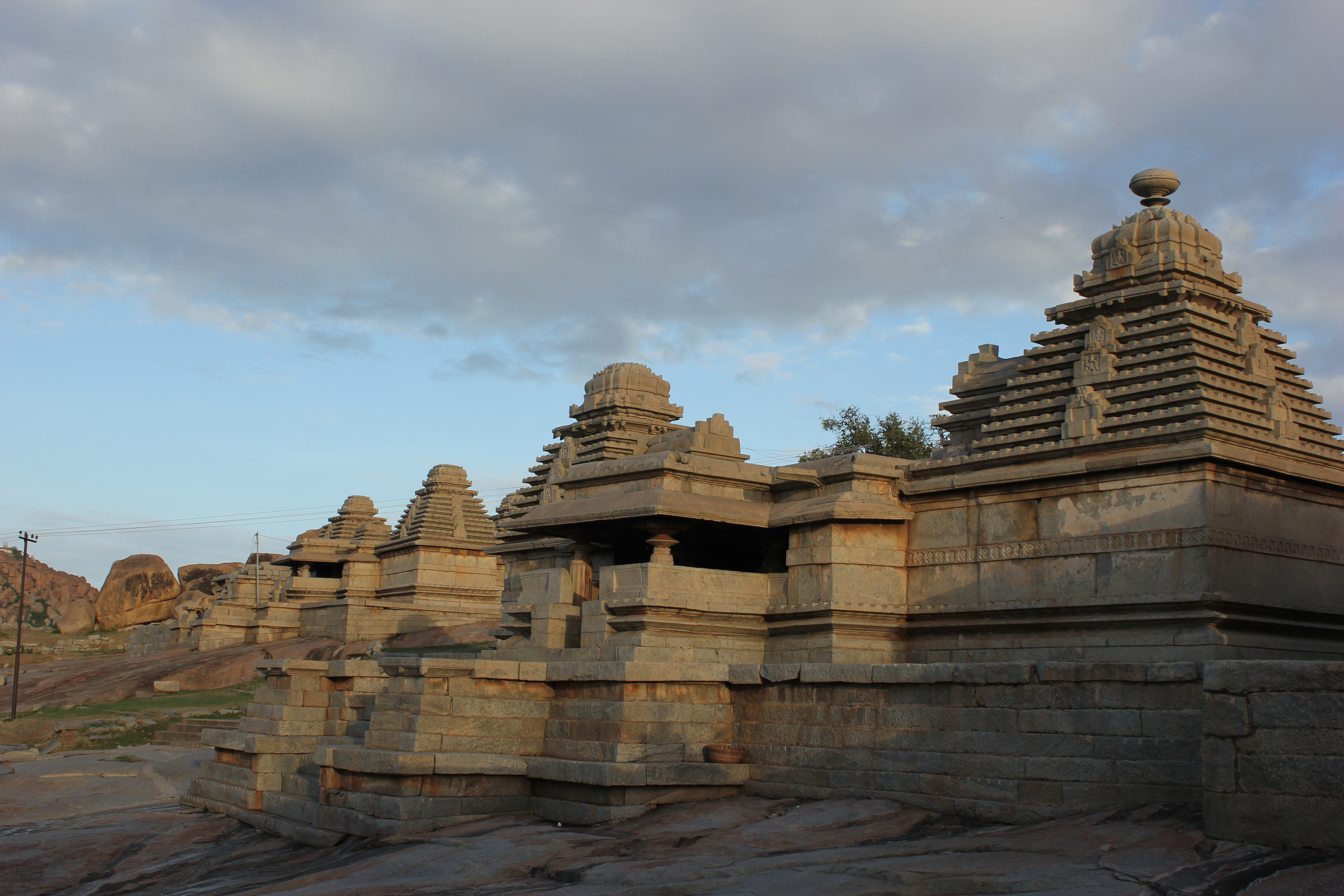
Two Shiva temples on Hemakuta hill at Hampi

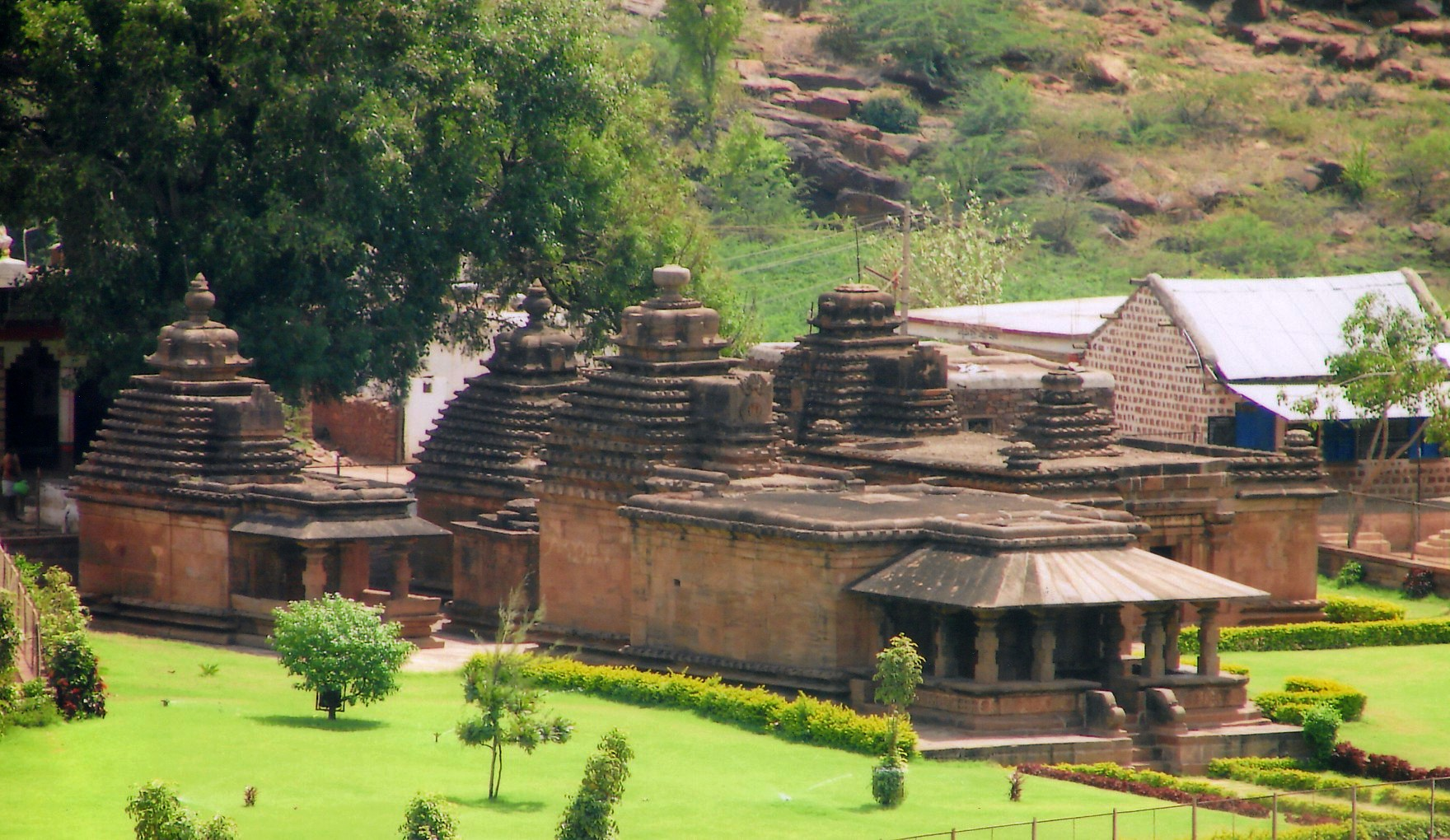
Mallikarjuna group of temples at Badami

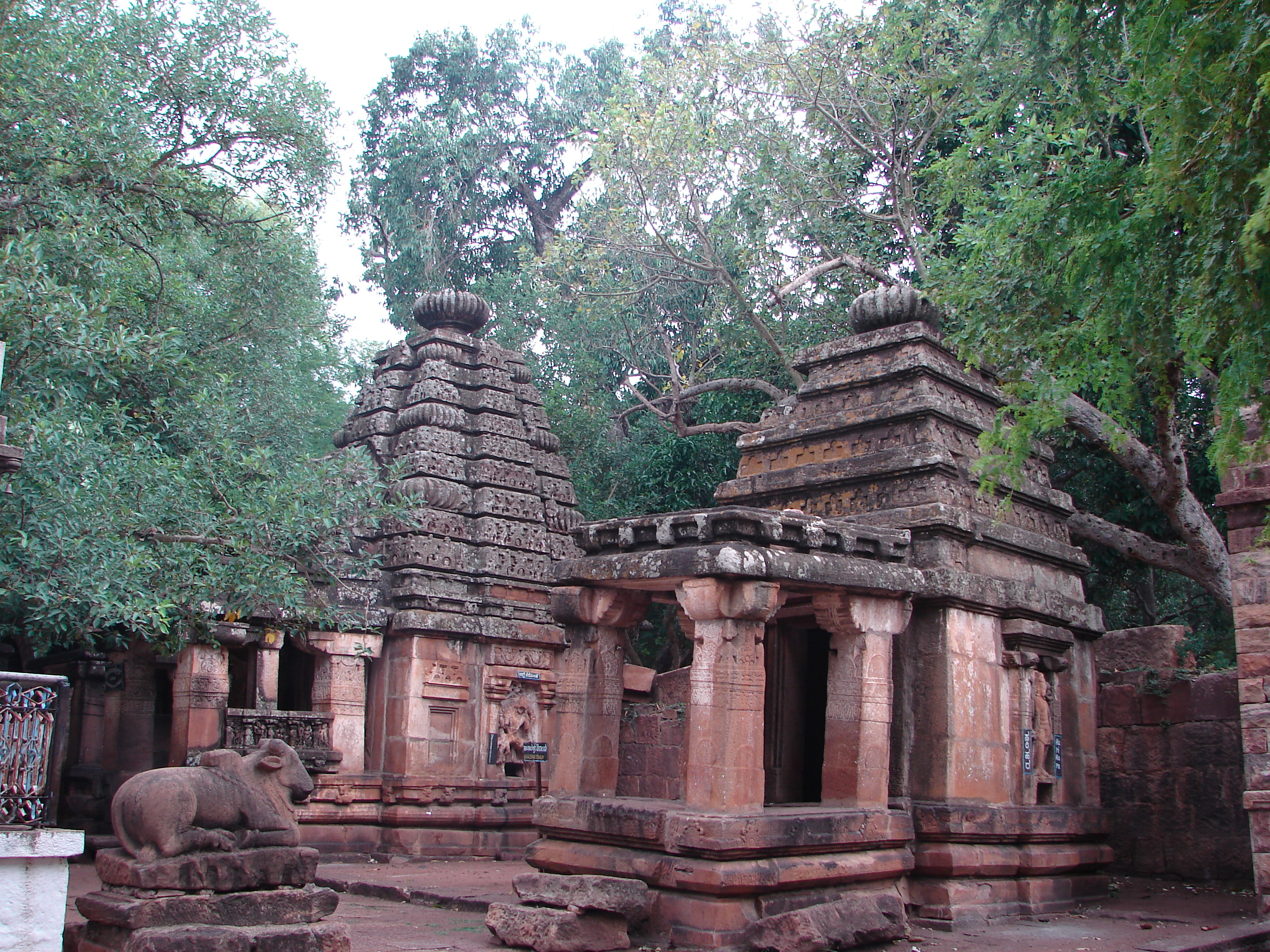
A shrine with Kadamba style superstructure at Mahakuta

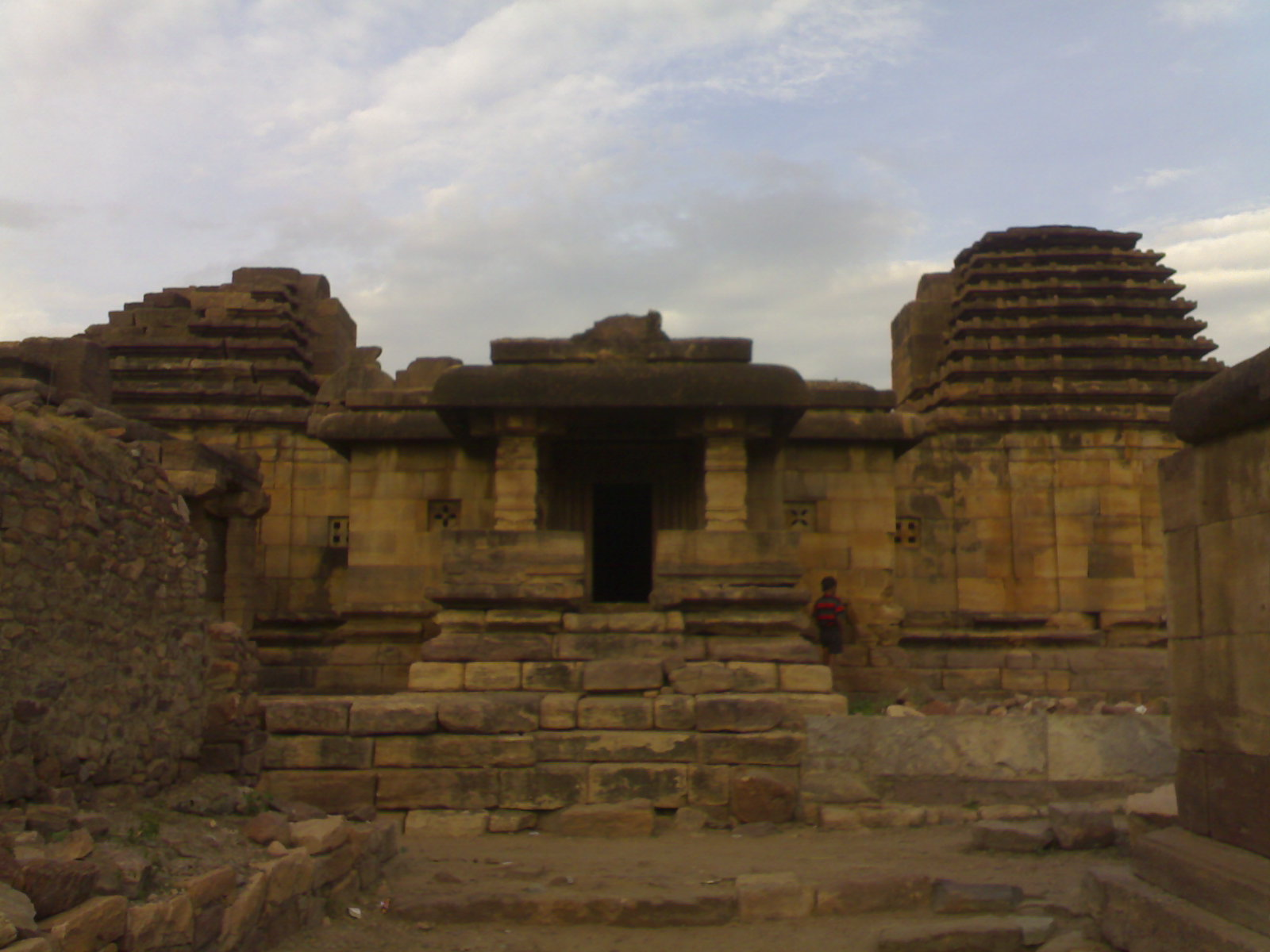
Ruined temple at Aihole near Durga temple, in Kadamba style

The 5th century monuments at Halasi are the oldest surviving Kadamba structure. The most prominent feature is the Kadamba Shikara with a Kalasa on top. In Belgaum district, Hattikeshwara, Kalleshwara and Someshwara temples at Halasi and group of temples at Kadaroli illustrates the Kadamba architecture. The old Jain basadi containing a sanctum and a sukanasi at Halasi the most ancient stone temple in Karnataka. Kadamba architecture constituted an important link between the Shatavahanas, Pallavas and Chalukyas architecture. Kadamba architecture elements in Hoysala Architecture.

Aihole

Many temples at Aihole including Ramlingesvara temple Complex, Badigergudi temple and small shrines at Durga temple complex, Tryambakeshwara temple complex, ruined temple at Mallikarjuna temple complex, shrines at Jyotirlinga temple complex, small temple at Hucchimalli temple complex, ruined temples Galaganatha temple complex and many temples along the Malaprabha River are built in Kadamba architectural (Shikhara) style.

Badami

Kadamba style Mallikarjuna group of temples and Bhutanatha group of temples(temple on adjacent small hill top) at Badami.

Hampi

Including Jain temples and two Shiva temples and many ruined temples on Hemakuta hill at Hampi built in Kadamba style of architecture.

Mahakuta

There are many shrines with Kadamba superstructure at Mahakuta including Bhimeshwara ling temple, newly renovated temple outside main temple complex.

Bandalike

There are many temples and Basadis at Bandalike (Bandalika), it is about 35 km from Shikaripura including Shantinath basadi, Sahasralinga temple and Someshwara threemurthy temples those are of Rastrakutas and Kadambas period, temples built in Kadamba style of architecture.

Belgaum district

- Kamala Narayana Temple, Degaon (Degamve / Devgram)
- The Ruined temple at Konnur is 4 km from Gokak falls.
- Kamala basadi at Belagavi
- Bhutnath temple Torgal (Torgal Fort) near Munvalli in Belgaum district.
- Panchlingeshwara Temple Munavalli Belgaum district has Kadamba shikhara.
- Ramalingaeshwara temple at Bailhongal
- There are few ruined temples at Hooli with Kadamba shikhara.
- The ruined temple beside the river at Kadaroli has the Kadamba style shikara.
- Temples at Halasi and Ramtheerth temple a top of the hill near Halasi

Uttara Kannada district

- Including Madhukeshwara temple and Parvati temple many other temples at Banavasi has Kadamba style architecture (Shikhara).
- Ratnatraya Basti at Bilgi a small village near Siddapura, Uttara Kannada district of Karnataka.
- The 12th and 14th century AD Shankara Narayana temple at Haliyur and Venkataramana Swamy temple at Muttinkere near Sonda in Sirsi taluk of Uttarkannada district.
- Mallikarjuna Temple at Haliyal.

Hassan district

- Yoga Narasimha temple at Holalu in Hassan district
- The Kadamba Bettada Byreshwara Shiva temple built in black stone near Hanbal a hill station of Sakleshpur (in Western Ghats) in Hassan district.
- The Kadamba style Keerthinarayana temple is at Heragu in Hassan district.

Gadag district

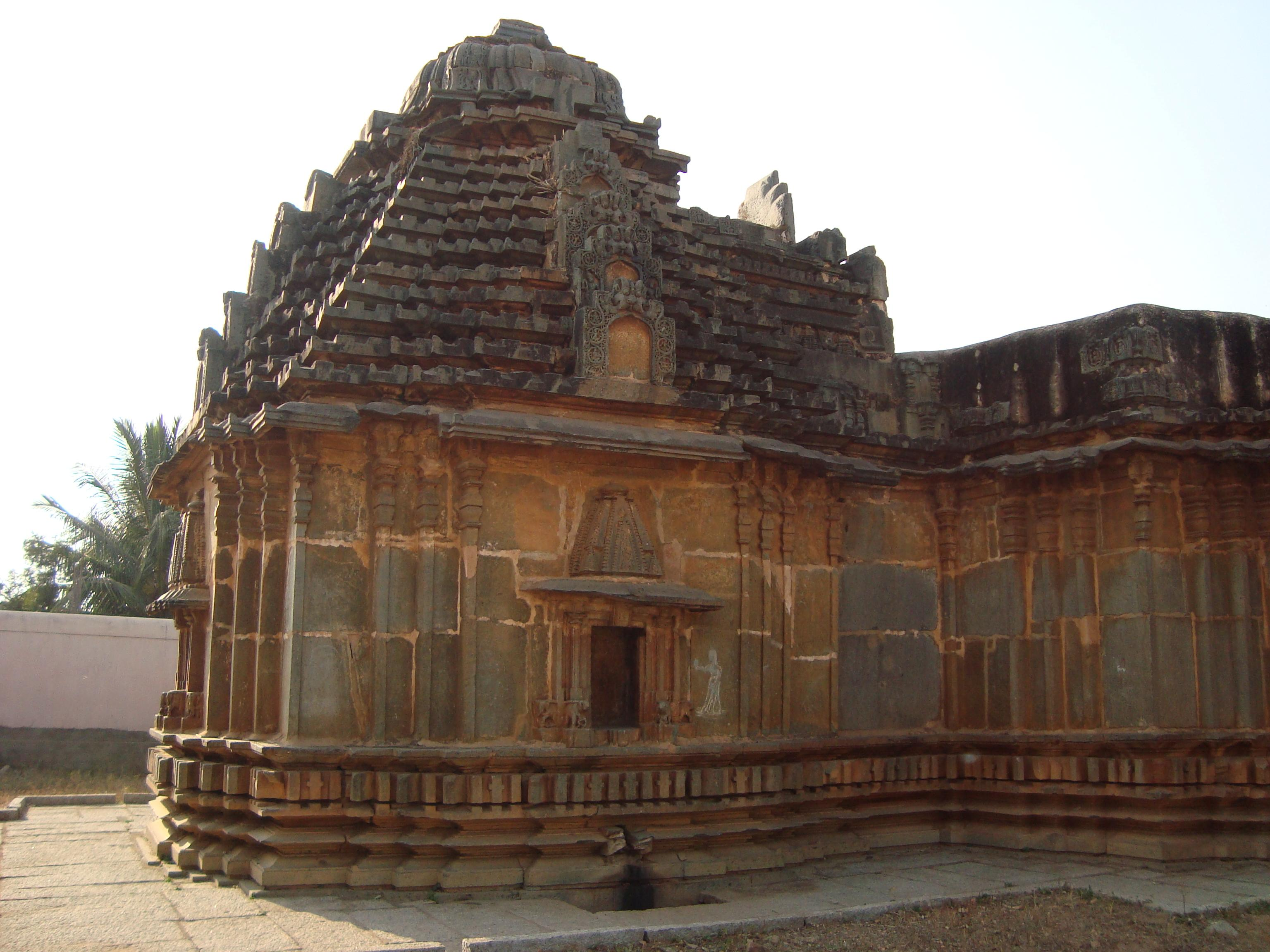
Jain temple at Lakshmeshwara

- The old Jain temple at Lakshmeshwara has Kadamba shikara.
- Trilingeshwara temple at Hosur in Gadag district
- Narasimha temple Gadag, veera narayana temple complex Gadag

Haveri district

- The Kere Someshwara Temple at Kalakeri in Hangal taluk of Haveri district, is in Kadamba style architecture (Shikhara).
- Basavann Temple in the Chaudayyadanapura Mukteshwara temple complex, Haveri District.
- Narasimha temple Narasapura near Chaudayyadanapura, Haveri District.
- Veerabhadra temple Hale Honatti in Ranebennur taluk of Haveri district

Chikmagalur district

- The Kadamba style Bhairaveshwara Temple at Byrapura, 22 km from Mudigere (in western ghats) in Chikmagalur district near to Kukke Subramanya.
- Prasanna Rameshwara Temple Devarunda, Mudigere in Chikmagalur district
- Malahanikareshvara, Bhavani temples shringeri.

Other parts of Karnataka

- The 12th century AD Shiva temple at Udri Shimoga built in Kadamba style architecture.
- Mallikarjuna Temple and Neelakanteshwara Temple, Kalasi
- Tryambakeshwara temple (Trikutachala) with Kadamba Shikhara at Kavital in Manvi taluk in Raichur district.
- Jain temple at Brahmagiri hill in Chitradurga district.

Other parts of India
Maharashtra

- Panchaganga Temple at Kolhapur built in Kadamba style.
- Mahabaleshwar Temple, Krishnai Temple Mahabaleshwar in Maharashtra
- Kaneri math kadamba style is in Karveer tehsil in Kolhapur district in Maharashtra

Andhra Pradesh

- Temples at Srisailam built during Vijayanagara empire (by Harihara Raya) has Kadamba Shikhara.

Telangana

- Papanasi group of temples at Alampur dedicated to Joglamba devi are built in Kadamba style architecture.
- Chaya Someshwara temple at Panagal in Nalgonda.
- Ramappa temple in Mulug district
- Thousand pillar temple in Warangal

== Chalukya-Kadamba architectural style ==
- The Uma Maheshwara temple at Hosagunda in Sagar taluk of Shimoga district.

== Hoysala-Kadamba architectural style ==
- Aghoreshwara Temple at Ikkeri
- Late Hoysala Trikutachala temple built in granite has Kadamba Nagara shikhara.
- The Eshwara Temple at Malali (Holenarasipura Taluk) in Hassan district in Karnataka, an early Hoysala structure with Kadamba Nagara style shikara.
- Lakshmi Devi temple, Doddagaddavalli built by Hoysala.

== Kadamba-Yadava architectural style ==
- Mahadev Temple, Tambdi Surla

== Temples with this style ==
- Ananta Vasudeva Temple
- Champakesvara Siva Temple
- Lingaraja Temple
- Mangalesvara Siva Temple
- Purvesvara Siva Temple
- Rajarani Temple
- Yameshwar Temple
- Mahavinayak Temple
- Baladevjew Temple
- Ramappa Temple
- Thousand Pillar Temple

== See also ==
- Hindu temple architecture
- Architecture of Karnataka
- Badami Chalukya Architecture
- Gadag style of Architecture
- Karnata Dravida architectural style of Rashtrakuta
- Karnataka Dravida architectural style
- Hemadpanthi and Hemadpant
- Shikhara
- Halasi, Hangal, Banavasi

== Gallery of Kadamba Shikhara ==
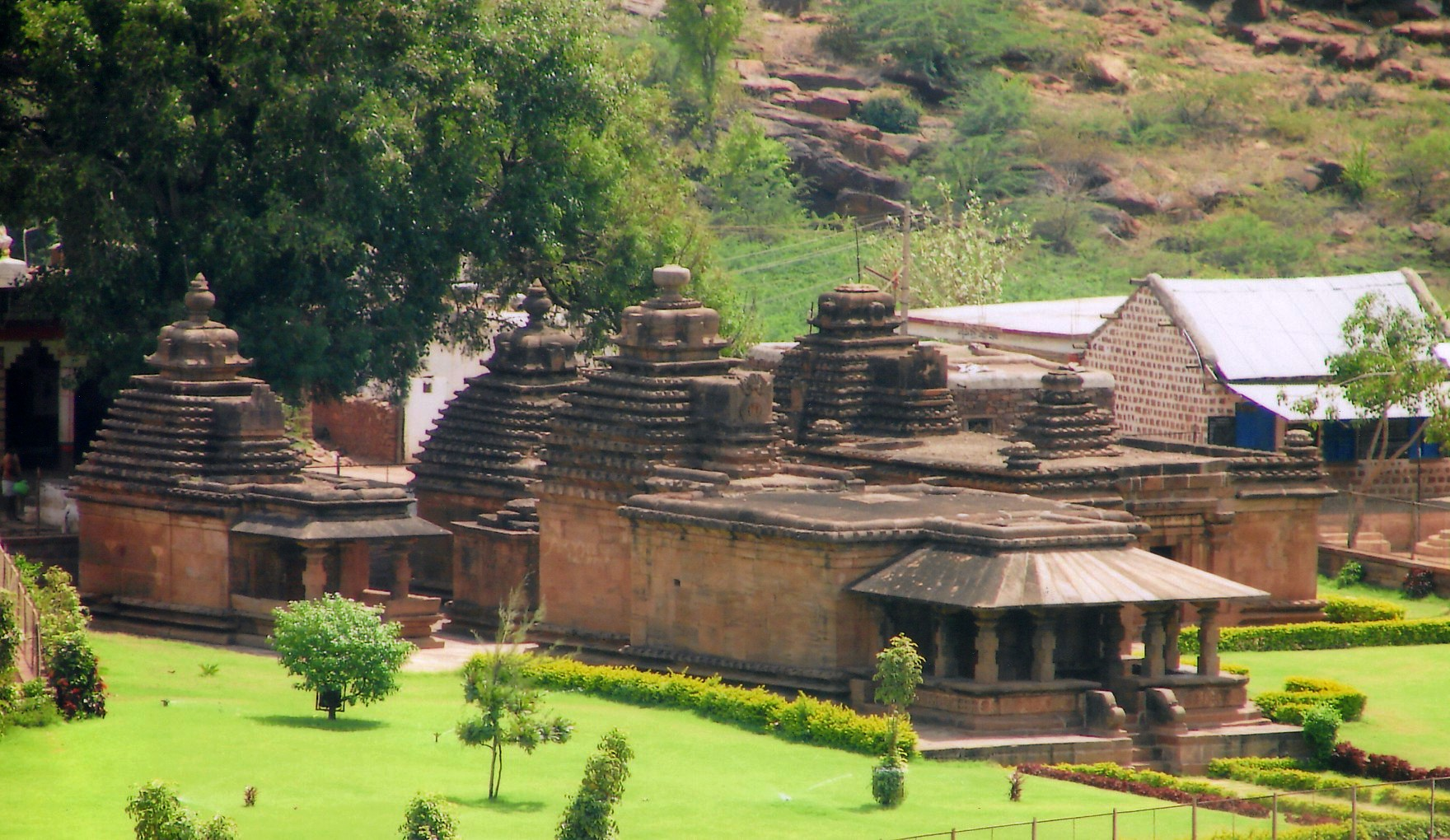
Mallikarjuna group of temples at Badami

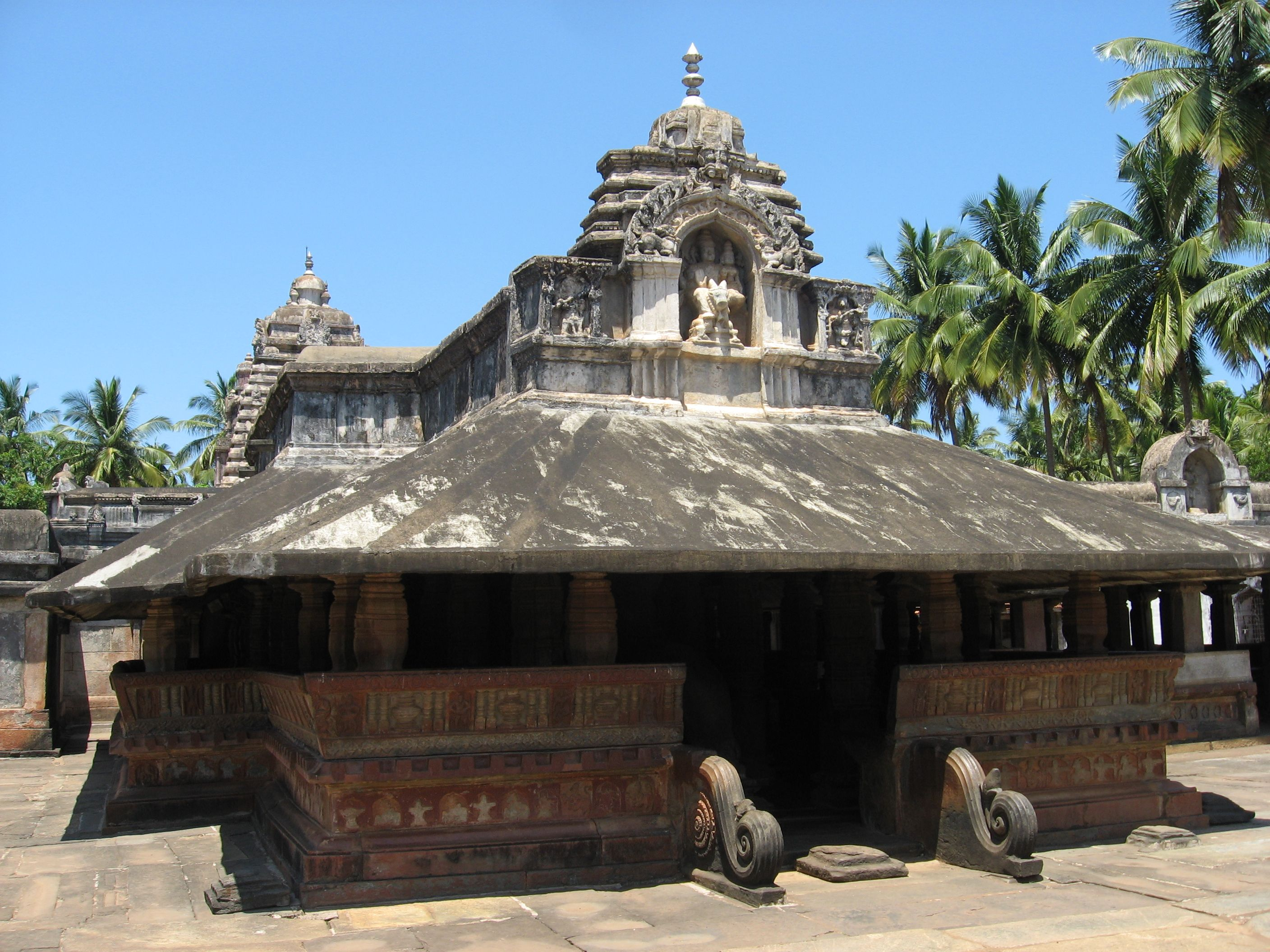
Madhukeshwara Temple at Banavasi

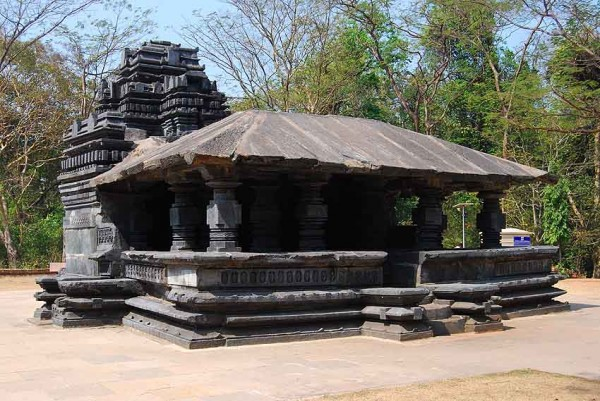
Mahadev Tambdi Surla Goa

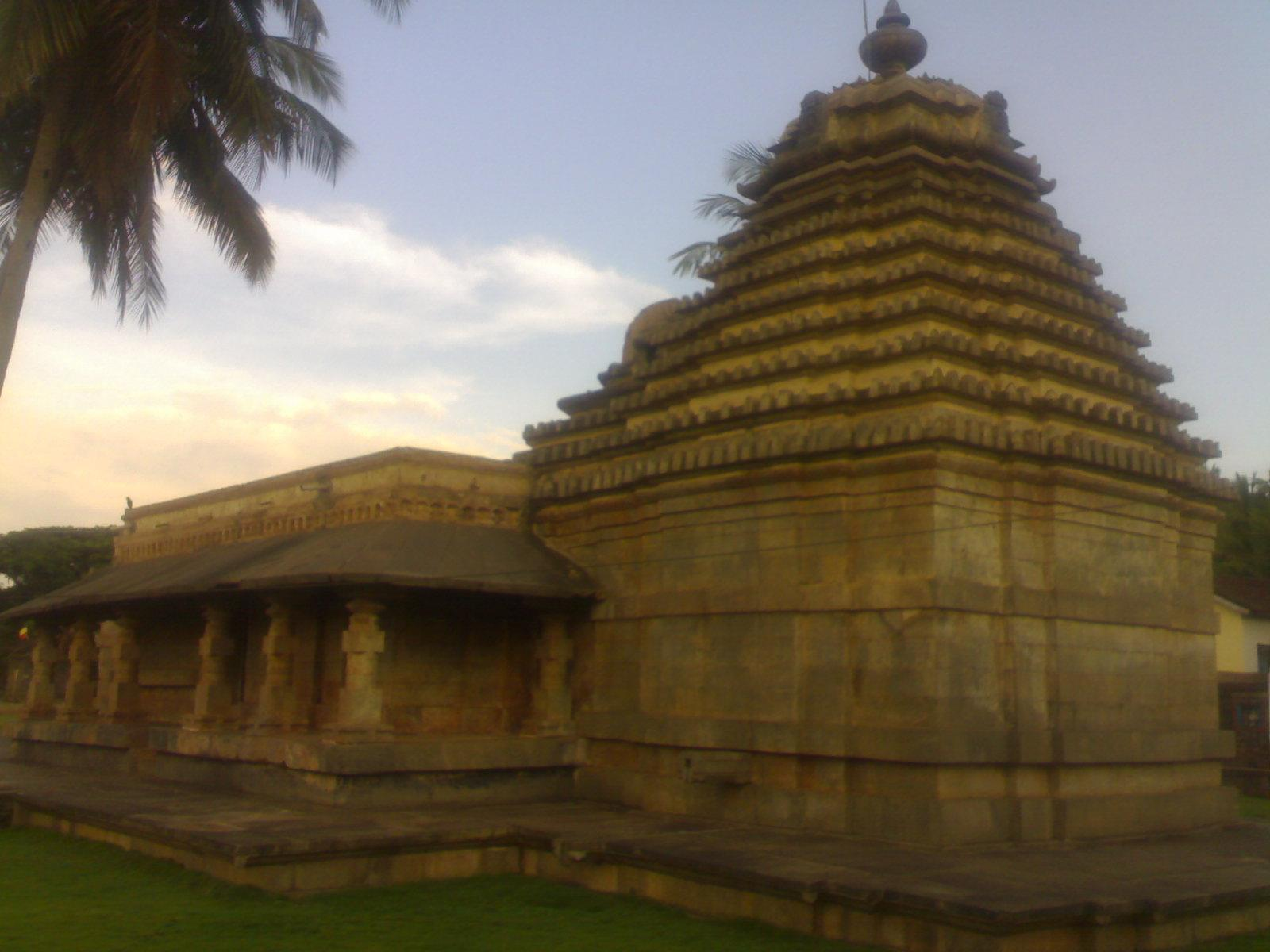
Bhuvaraha Narasimha temple Halasi

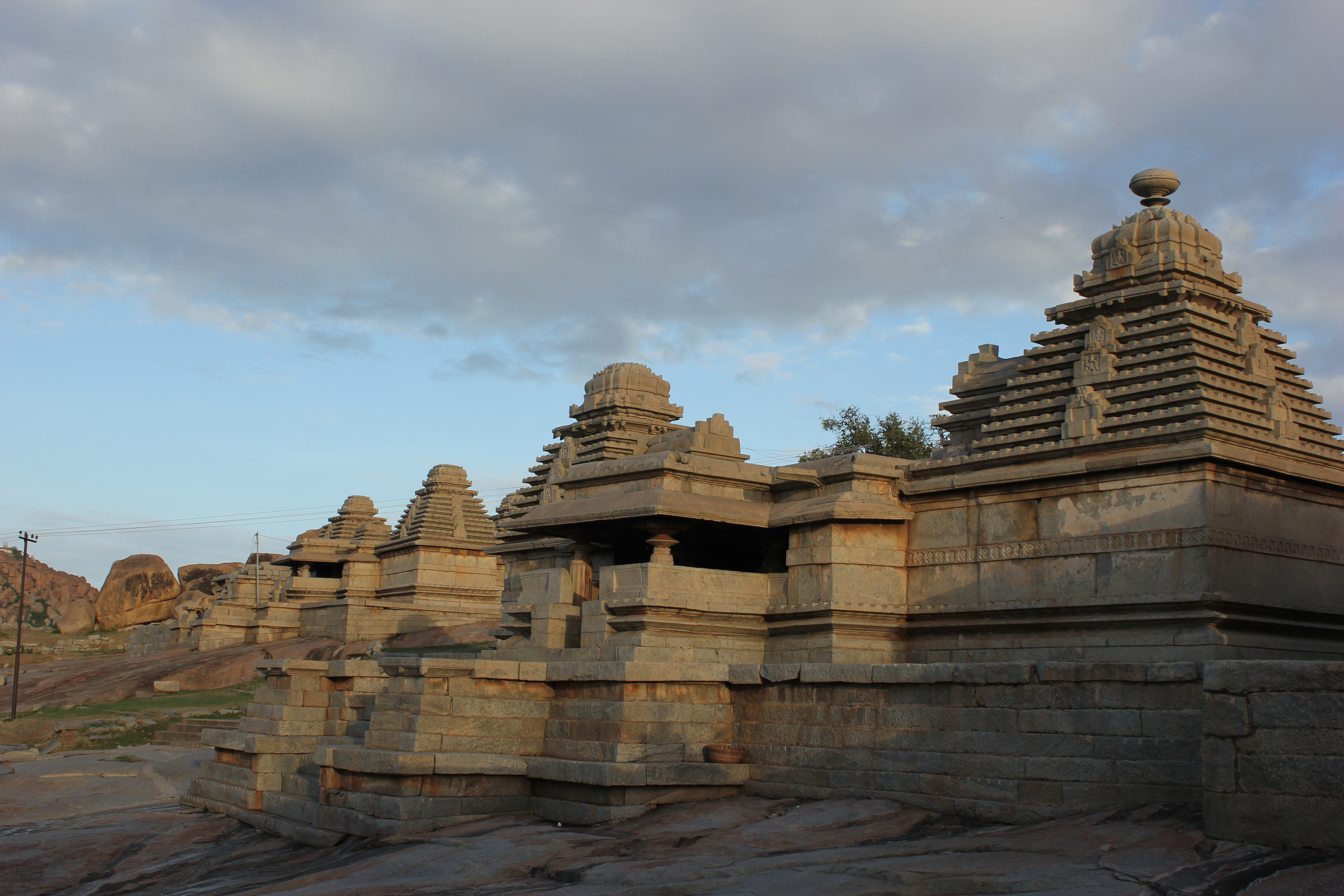
Two Shiva temples on Hemakuta hill at Hampi

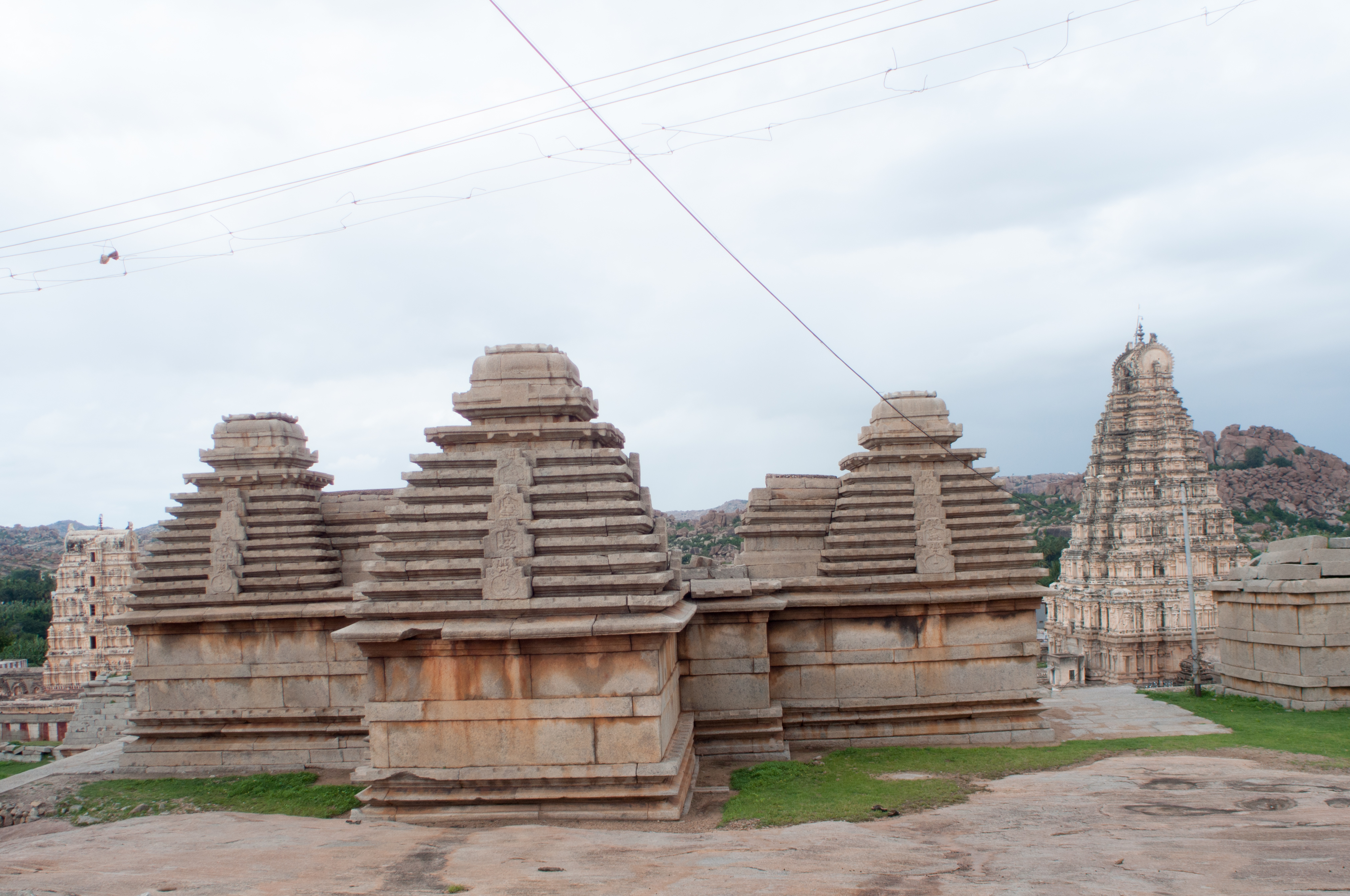
Kadamba temples on Hemakuta hill at Hampi near Virupaksha temple

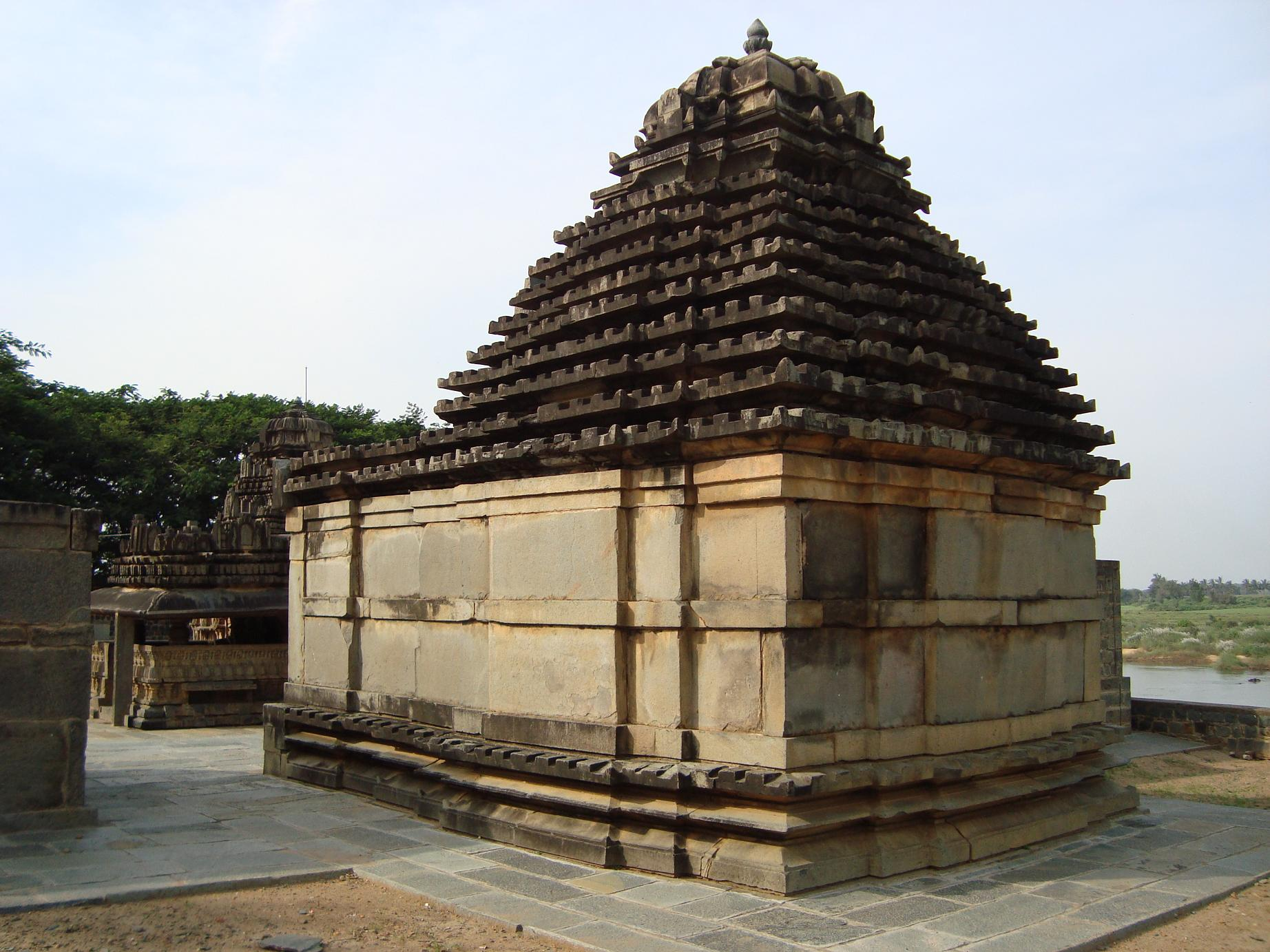
Temple in the Chaudayyadanapura Mukteshwara temple complex

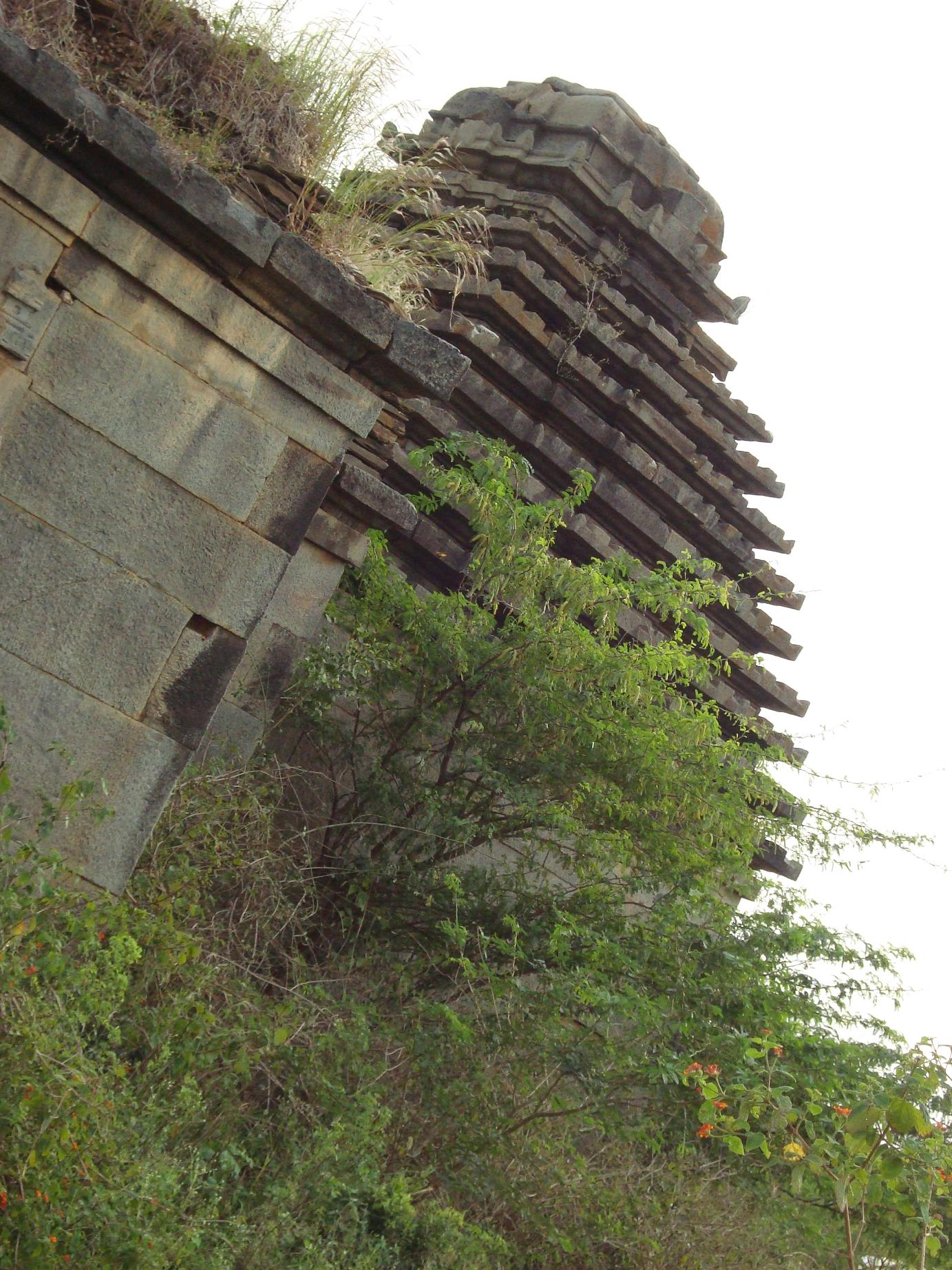
Narasimha temple Narasapura near Chaudayyadanapura, Haveri District, Karnataka

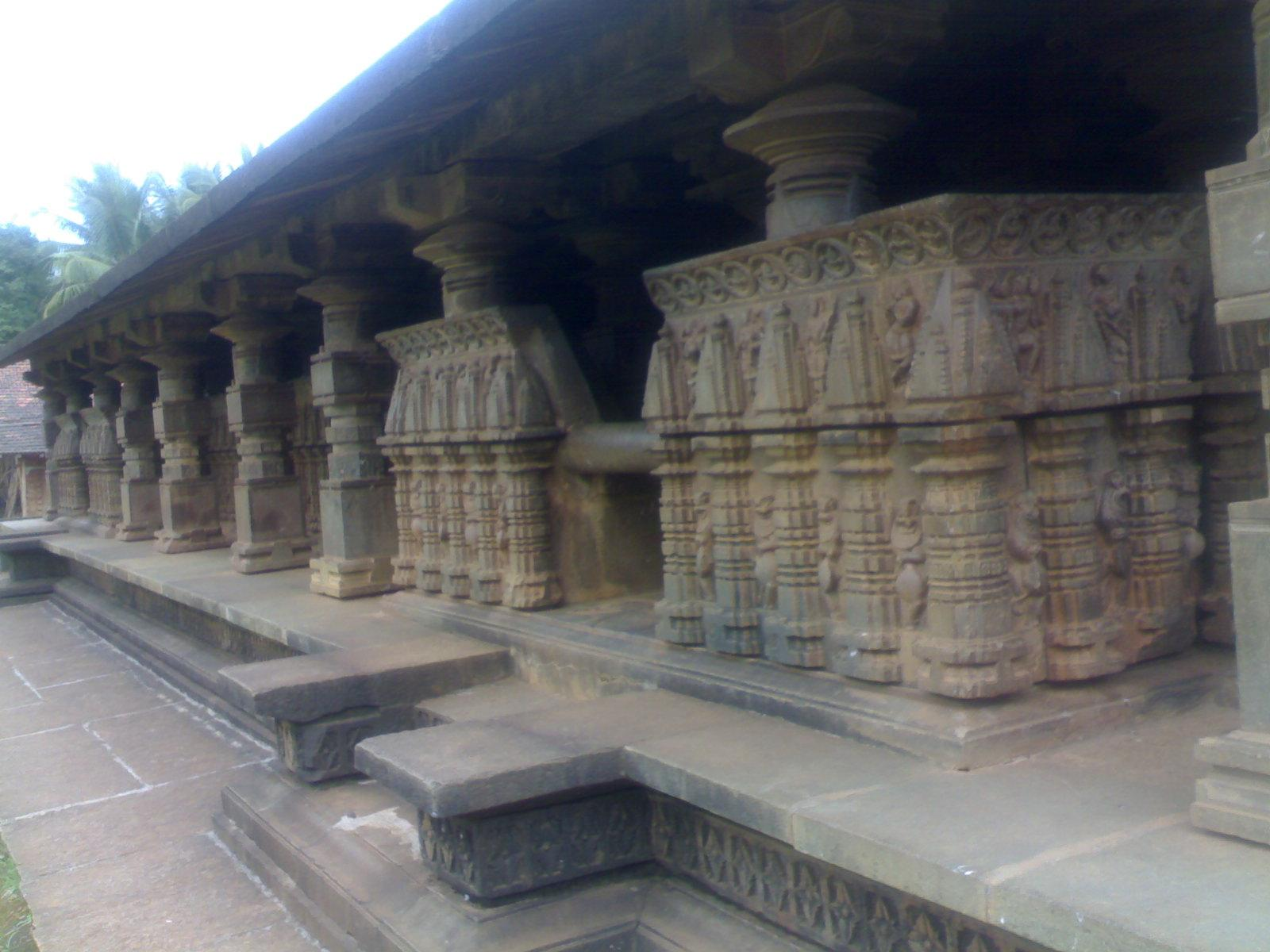
Kamala Narayana Temple at Degaon

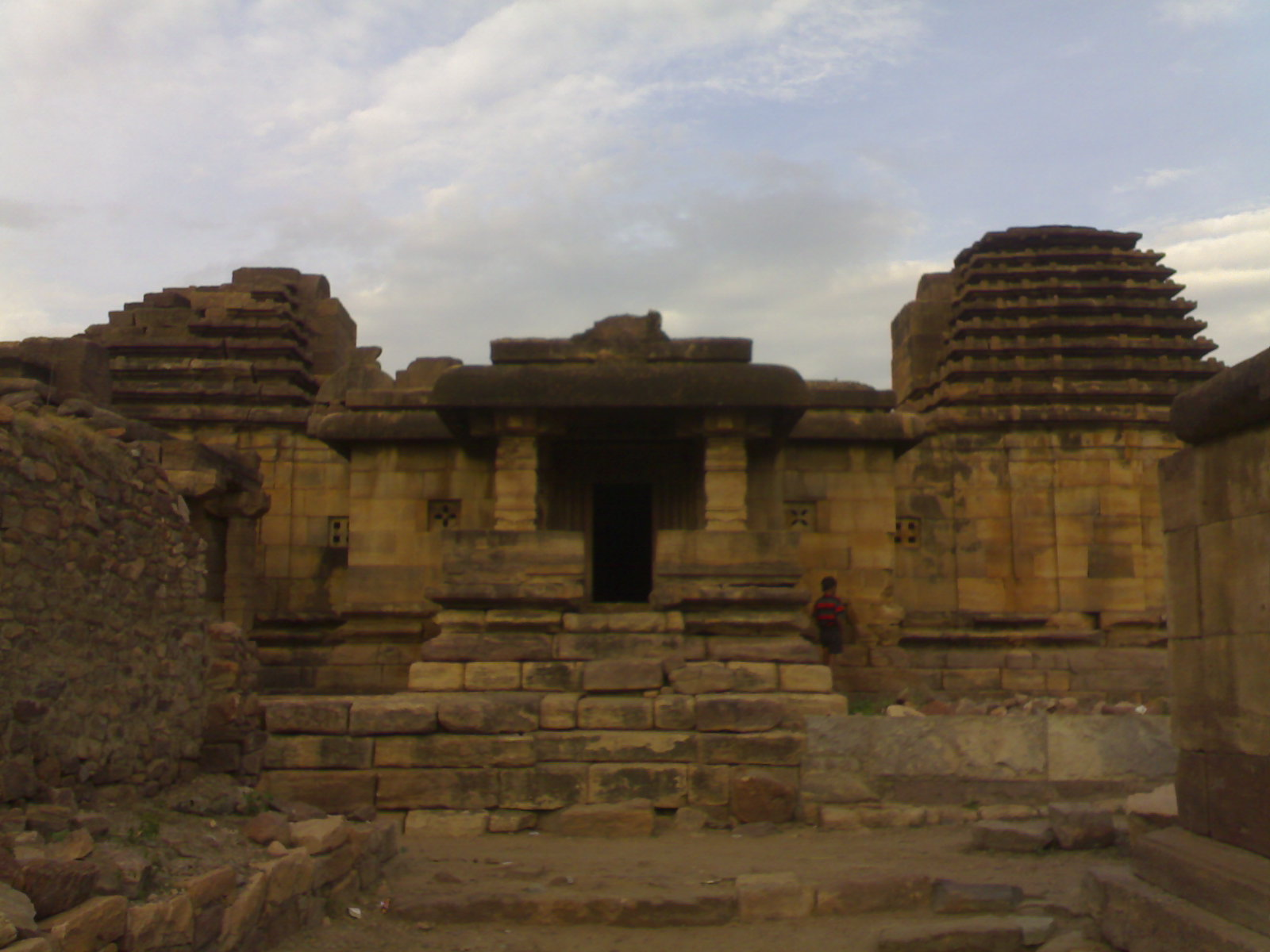
Ruined temple at Aihole with Kadamba tower

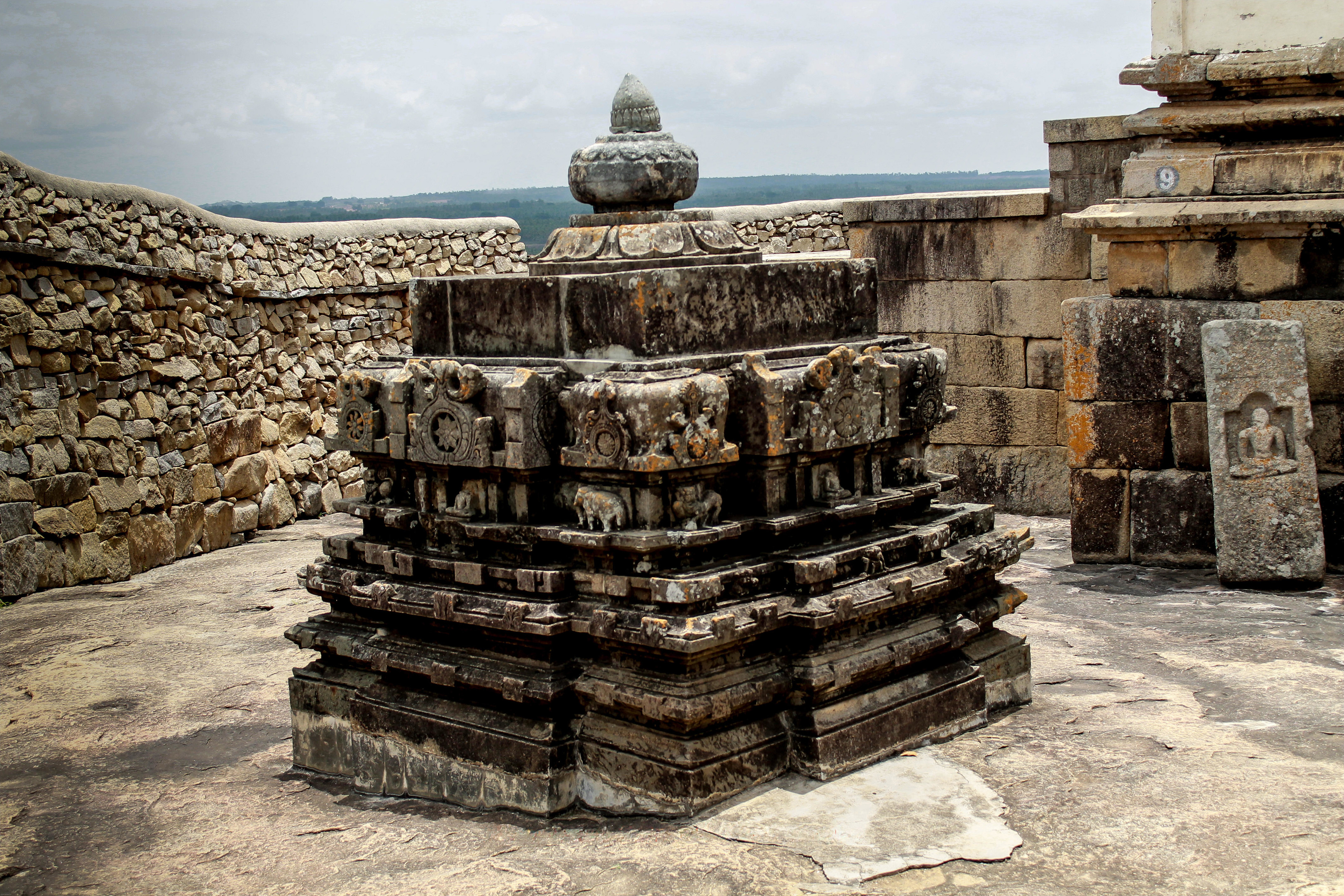
Stone curved kalasa, Chandragiri Hill at Shravanabelagola

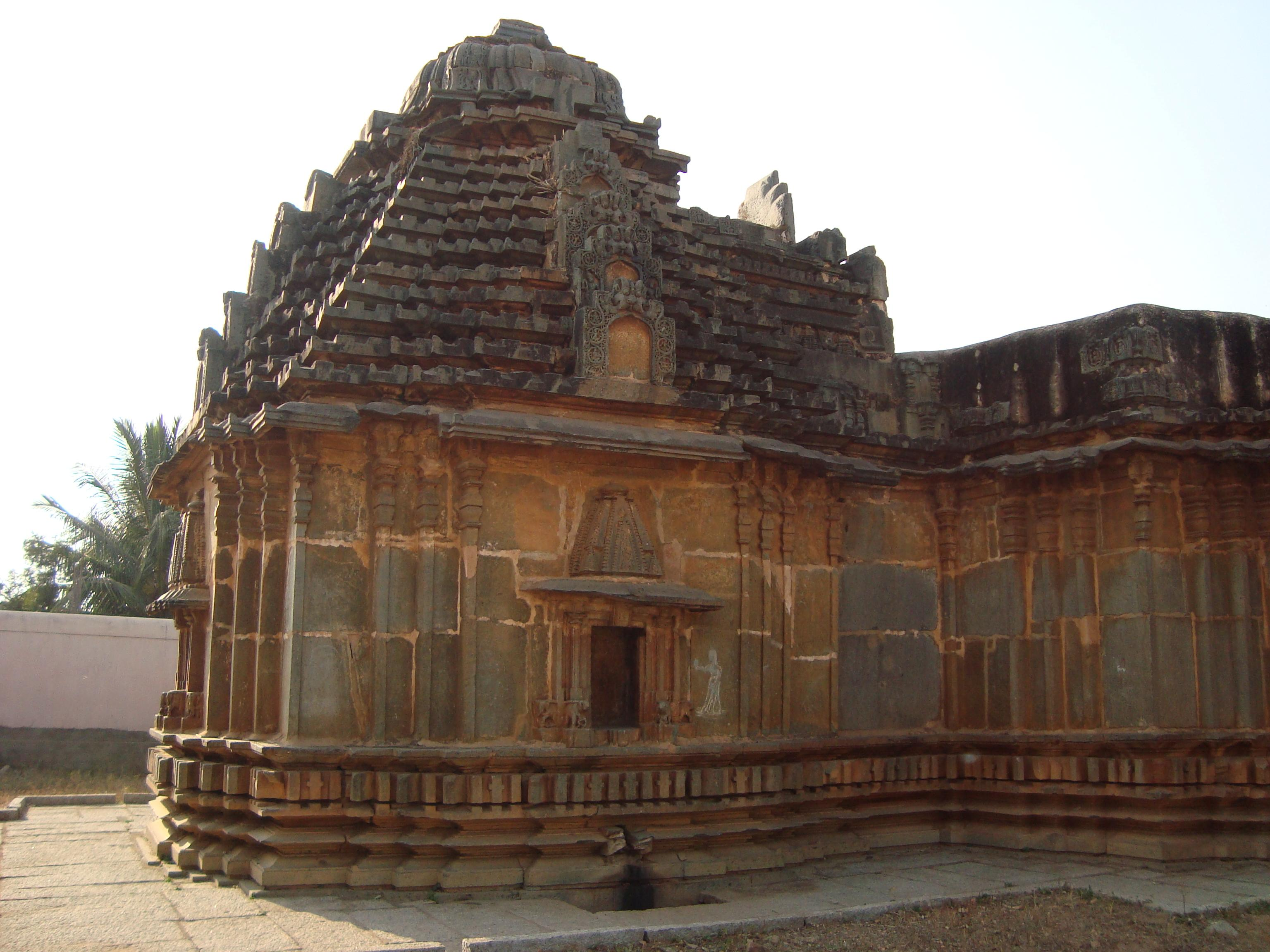
Lakshmeshwara Old Jain temple

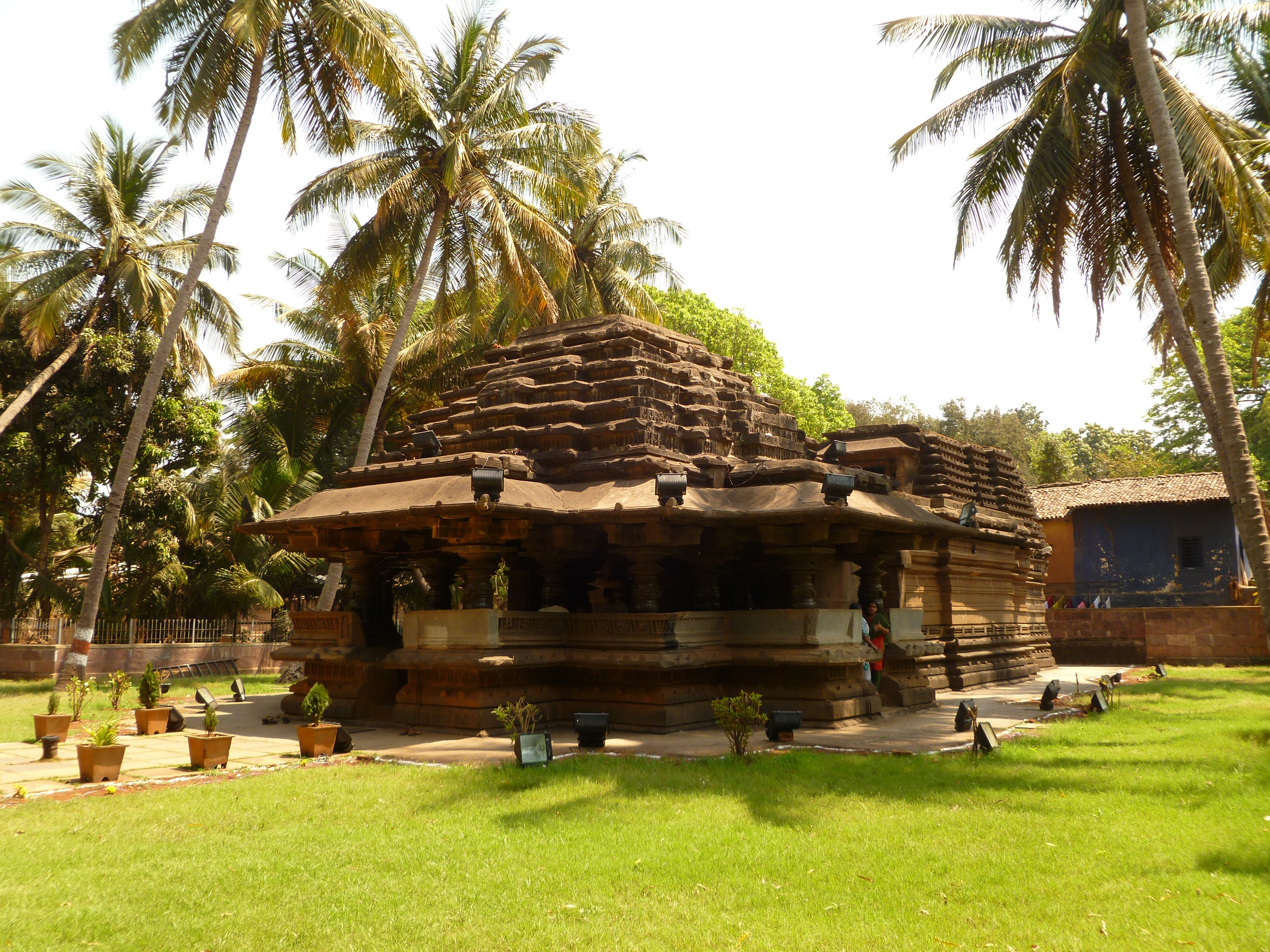
Kamala basadi Belagavi

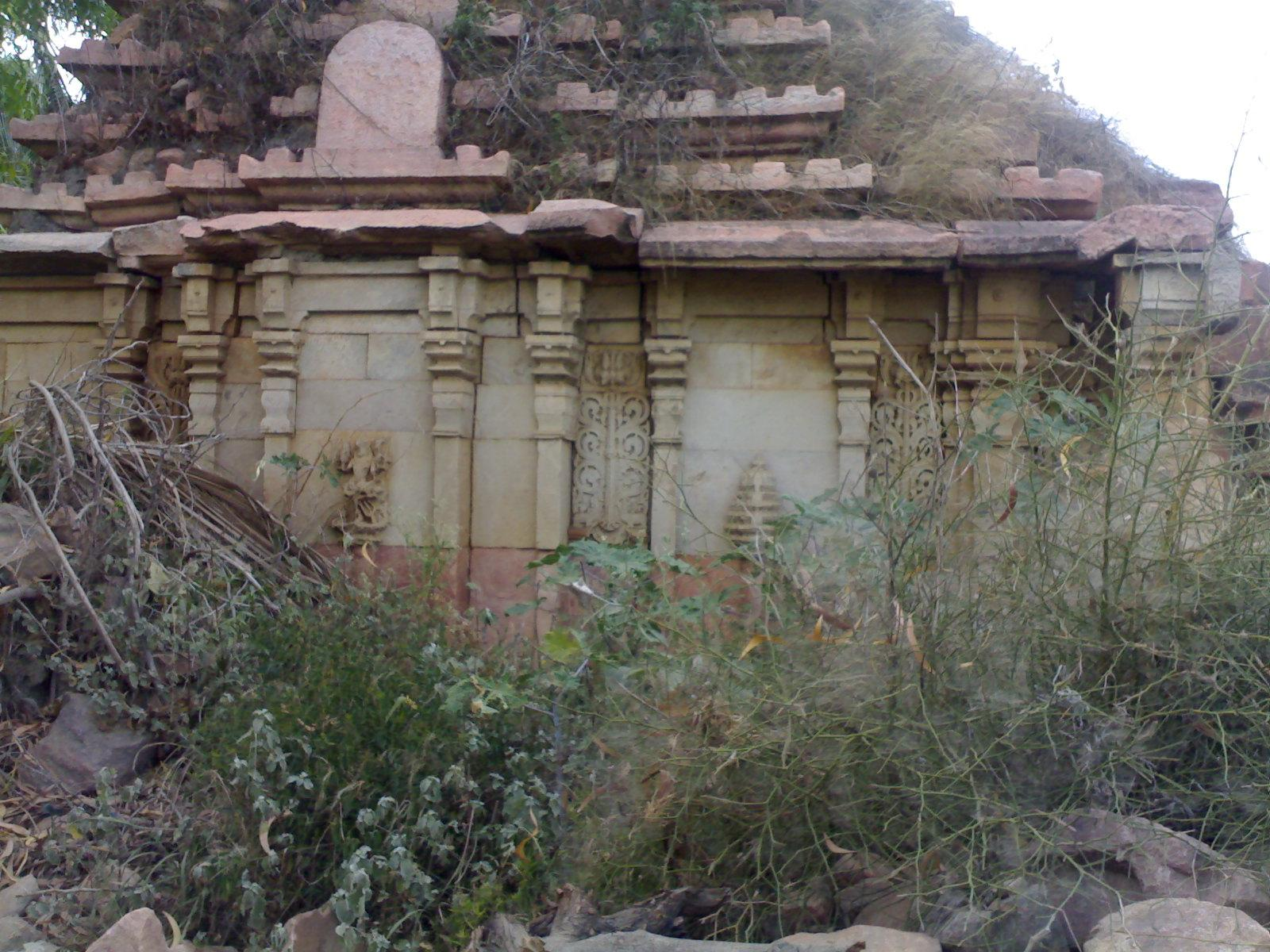
Ruined temple at Hooli
