= Uchangidurga =

- Village
- Interactive map of Uchangidurga
- Country: India
- State: Karnataka
- District: Vijayanagara
- Taluk: Harapanahalli

Population (2011)
  - Total: 9,781

Languages
  - Official: Kannada
- Time zone: UTC+5:30 (IST)
- Postal code: 583 125
- Vehicle registration: KA-35

Uchangidurga is a main Holy & Historical village/town in Harapanahalli Taluk of Vijayanagara District in Karnataka, India. It is 29km away from both Harapanahalli and Davanagere, it is located on state highway 47 & it comes under Harapanahalli taluk of Vijayanagara district in Karnataka.

== Demographics ==
As of 2011 India census, Uchangidurga Village has a population of 9781, of which 4926 are males and 4855 are females.

== Location ==
Uchangidurga is located 30 km from Davangere on the Anaji route. After taking a left turn, the fort is visible from the junction.

== See also ==
- Bellary
- Districts of Karnataka
