= Halasi =

Halasi Halasi (Palāśikā)
- Former capital of Kadambas
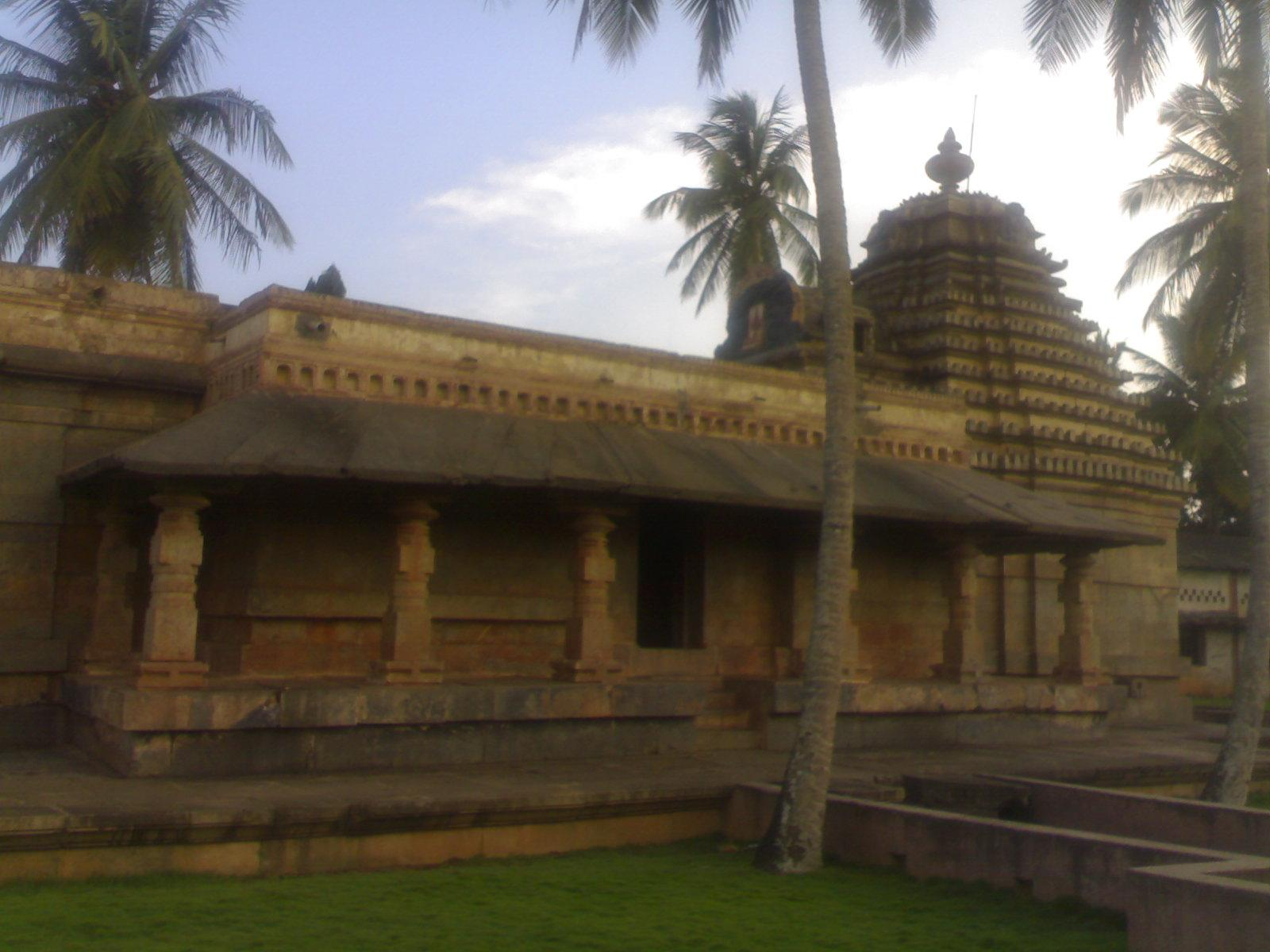
- Bhuvaraha Narasimha temple at Halasi

- Location in Karnataka, India
- Coordinates: 15.54°N 74.59083333333332°E
- Country: India
- State: Karnataka
- District: Belgaum
- Elevation: 649 m (2,129 ft)

Languages
  - Official: Kannada
- Time zone: UTC+5:30 (IST)
- PIN: 591120
- Telephone code: 08336
- ISO 3166 code: IN-KA
- Nearest city: Belgaum

Halasi (Kannada: ಹಲಸಿ, also Halsi or Halshi, in earlier times also called Halasige or Palasige) is a town in Khanapur Taluk, Belgaum District in Karnataka, India. It is 14 km from Khanapur and about 25 km from Kittur. As known from inscriptions, the ancient name of the town was Palāśikā. A centre of the early Kadamba Dynasty (c. 500), it was a minor capital of the Goa Kadambas (980-1025). The town is notable for a series of medieval temples. The most famous are the Varāha Narasiṃha temple and Suvarṇeśvara temple in the town, and a third temple of Rāmeśvara. On a hill about 1.9 km. south-west of the town is a pilgrimage place known as Rāmatītha.

== History ==
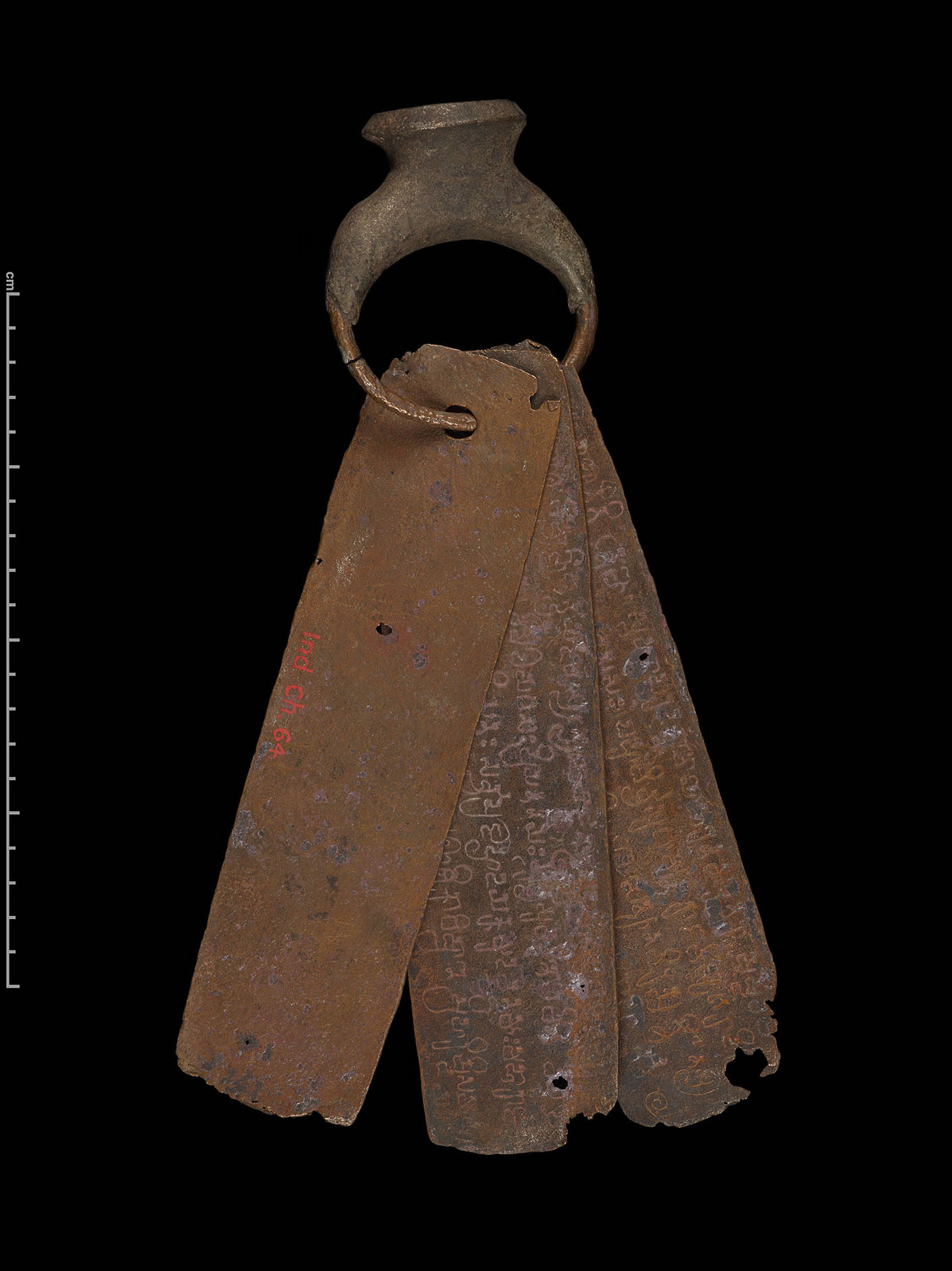
Copper-plate charter of Harivarman (c. 500-15) from Halasi, Karnataka, recording a grant of land, see https://siddham.network/inscription/ob01057/

Of the ancient settlement of Palāśikā no architectural remains have been found, but A. Sundara has noted traces of brick structures near the Kalleśvara temple (also known as Kalameshwar) on the west side of the town. The main evidence of early Palāśikā is a series of copper plates discovered in the 1850s at a location then known as Cakratīrtha. Fleet states that the plates "were found some sixteen years ago in a mound of earth close to a small well called Chakratîrtha, a short distance outside Halsi on the road to Nandigaḍ." The charters all record Jain grants and range from the time of Kākutsthavarman (c. 405-430) through Ravivarman (c. 465-500) and Harivarman (c. 500-15).

== Varāha Narasiṃha Temple ==
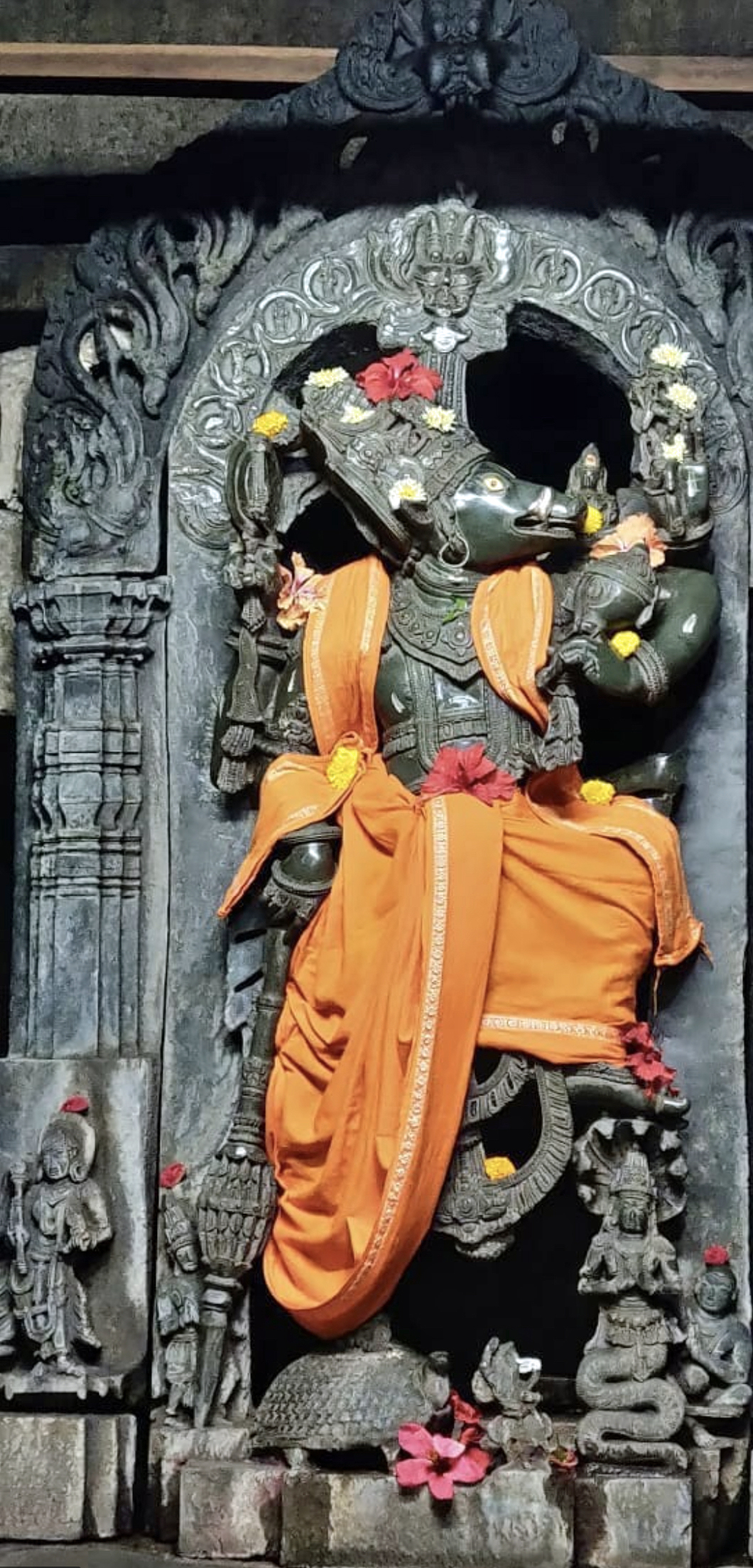
The image of Vishnu is his incarnation as Varaha inside the Varāha Narasiṃha temple at Halsi

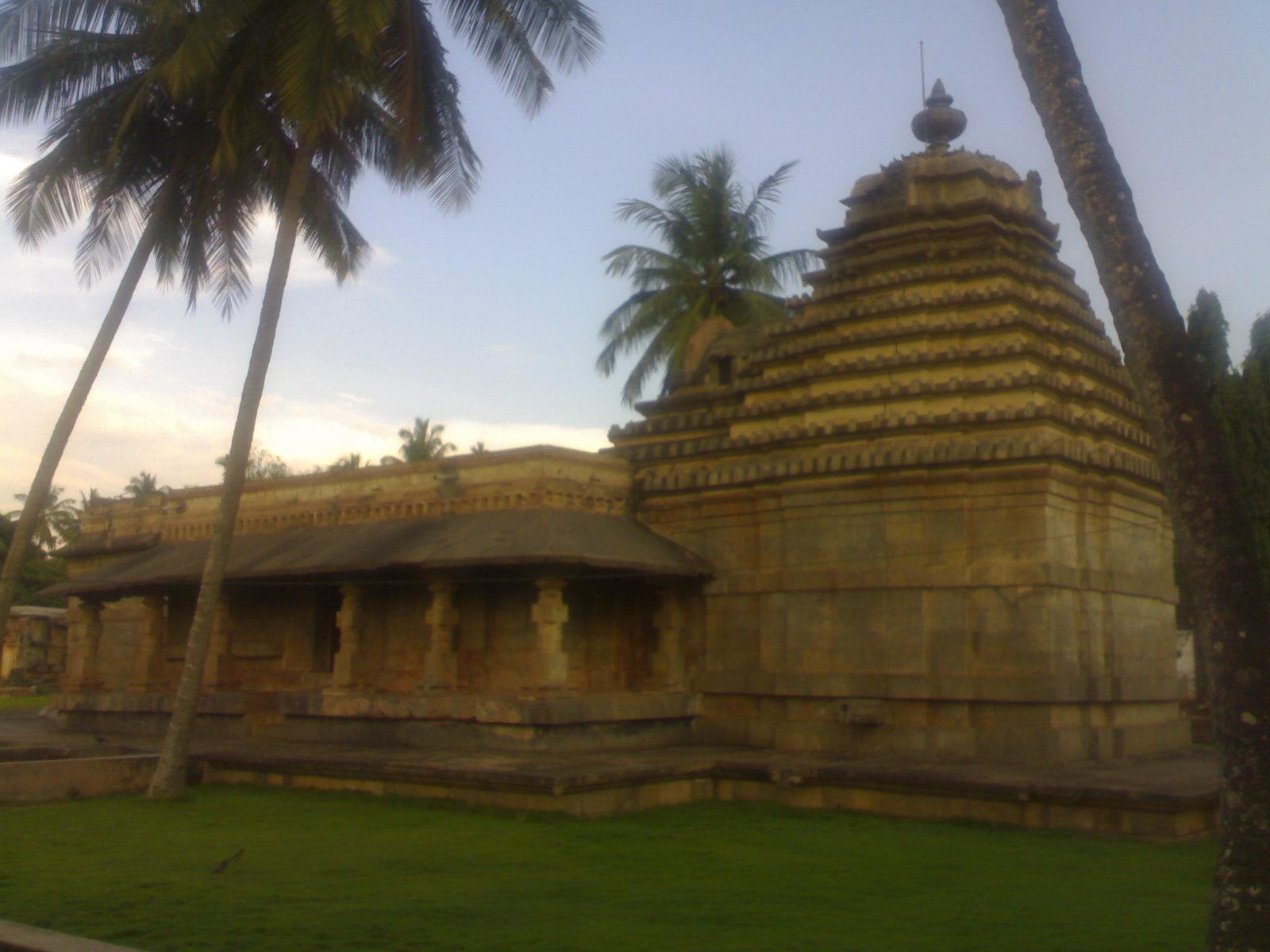
Bhuvaraha Narasimha temple Halasi, Karnataka

This temple is under the protection of the Archaeological Survey of India and appears in the List of Monuments of National Importance in Belgaum district. Traditions noted in the nineteenth century ascribe its construction to Jakhnācāraya. This appears to refer to the popular hero Amarashilpi Jakanachari. A large stone tablet inside the temple carries an inscription over sixty lines in two parts that record gifts in different years. The first is dated 1169 (Kali Yuga 4369) and registers the gift of a village by the sixth Goa Kadamba Permādi or Shivchitt (1147-1175) to Brahmins for the performance of rites to the holy Narasiṃha whose shrine had been established in the pure city of Halsi by Mātāyogi. The second inscription belongs to Vijayāditya II and is the only inscription of his reign. Dated 1171–72 (Kali Yuga 4272–73) in the twenty-fifth year of his reign, it records the gift of a village name Bhalaka.

Inside the temple there are two garbhagṛha chambers facing each other. In the right one is the deity of Lord Śrī Viṣṇu in a sitting posture. The deity of Sūryanarāyaṇa and Mahālakṣmī are just behind the main deity. The chamber on the left side has the deity of Bhūvāraha Swami, lord Vishnu's Varaha avatar, where he carries Mother Earth (or Bhoodevi) on his tusk. Just outside the main temple are smaller temples dedicated to Ganesha, Shiva and Vitthala. One statue of Radha Krishna can also be seen in a smaller shrine.

A yearly fair is held at the temple on the full moon of Ashvin. On the full-moon day of Kārttika or Kartik Purnima, the palanquin of Varāhanarasiṃha is carried in procession to the temple of Rāmeśvara.

== Śrī Suvarṇeśvara temple ==
This temple is located at the eastern side of Halsi and enshrines a Śivaliṅga. The spire of the temple is missing, and the large temple hall preserves only the columns and lintels. The style is austere throughout with little sculpture but there are large figures of Nandi and Gaṇeśa. The building belongs to the 12th century.

== Kalmeshwara temple ==
Located between the Suvarṇeśvara and Varāha Narasiṃha, this temple has a sanctum and large maṇḍapa. The maṇḍapa is notable for its stepped entrance with a curling balustrade. The massive pillars are in the mature Kadamba style with square, octagonal and round sections. The temple is in a large precinct that appears to have been fortified; to the north there are traces of an ancient rampart and projecting bastion.

== Digambar Jain Temple ==
The ruined Digambar Jain Temple is beside the Varāha Narasiṃha temple to the south-east. It is built of cyclopean masonry and lacks a spire. The maṇḍapa is enclosed and supported by turned and carved pillars of the late medieval type. The temple dates to the 11th or 12th century.

== Rāmatīrtha ==
A short distance to the south west of Halsi, on a rocky outcrop, is a natural water tank with two temples. Dedicated to Śiva as Rāmeśvara, the main building is a simple stone structure with a maṇḍapa. The pillars of the hall stand in the tank proper. The spire over the sanctum is similar in style to the Varāha Narasiṃha and it probably dates to the same period. A third ruined temple, with only some walls and parts of the door frame, is located a short distance to the south.

== Macigadh ==
Directly west of the town is a prominent hill with a fort known as Machigadh (ಮಾಚಿಗಡ ಕೋಟೆ). Rock-cut cisterns and cyclopean masonry mark the remains.

== See also ==
- Banavasi
- Goa
- Hangal
- Kadamba Dynasty
- Kamala Narayana Temple, Degaon (Degamve / Devgram)
- North Karnataka
- Tourism in North Karnataka
