= Kadambas of Goa =

Ruling Dynasty of Goa from 960 to 1310

- 960 CE–1310 CE
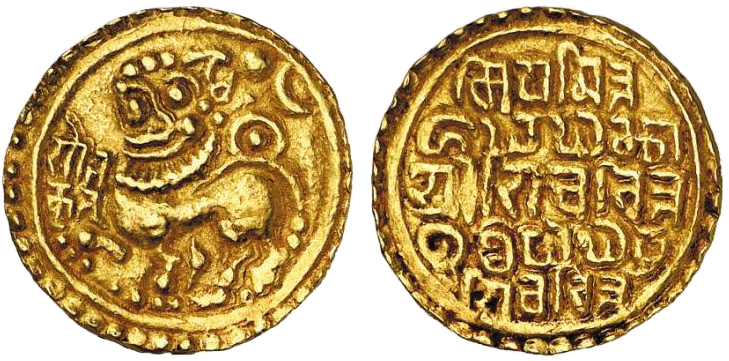
- Gold coins issued by the Kadamba king of Goa, Shivachitta Paramadideva, c. 1147–1187.

- Location of the Kadambas, and neighbouring South Asian polities in 1175, on the eve of the Ghurid invasions of the subcontinent.
- Capital: Goa
- Common languages: Kannada
- Religion: Hinduism
- Government: Monarchy
- History
  - Established: 960 CE
  - Disestablished: 1310 CE
Preceded by	Succeeded by
Shilahara dynasty	Tughlaq dynasty
- Today part of: India

Kadambas of Goa
Shashthadeva I (Kantakacharya)	960 AD
Nagavarma	~
Guhalladeva I	~
Shashathadeva II	~
Guhalladeva II	1038 AD
Veeravarmadeva	1042–1054 AD
Jayakeshi I	1050–1080
Guhalladeva II alias Tribhuvanamalla	1080–1125
Vijayaditya I alias Vijayarka	Ruling prince up to 1104
Jayakeshi II	1125–1148
Shivachitta paramadideva	1148–1179
Vishnuchitta alias Vijayaditya II	1179–1187
Jayakeshi III	1188–1216
Shivachitta Vajradeva	1193–1202
Sovideva Tribhuvanamalla	1216–1238
Shashthadeva III	1246–1265
Kamadeva (Husband of Kadamba princess Sovidevi)	1265–1310

The various centers of the Kadambas

The Kadambas of Goa were a dynasty during the Late Classical period on the Indian subcontinent, who ruled Goa from the 10th to the 14th century CE. They took over the territories of the Shilaharas and ruled them at first from Chandor, later making Gopakapattana their capital. As a feudatory of the Chalukyas, Kadamba Shasthadeva established the dynasty in 960 CE. During their rule, Goa's trade and arts flourished, and the dynasty built many Shiva temples.

== Origins ==
According to the Talagunda inscription found in Shimoga in Karnataka, the Kadambas are descended from Mayurasharma.

== Establishment of a separate dynasty ==
As a feudatory of the Chalukyas, Kadamba Shasthadeva was appointed as the Mahamandaleshwar of Goa by the Chalukya king, Tailapa II. According to the Savai vere inscription, the Kadambas were allies of the Chalukyas, whom they helped to defeat the Rashtrakutas. Shashthadeva later conquered the city of Chandrapur from the Shilaharas and established the Goan Kadamba dynasty in 960 CE.

== Gopakapattana ==
King Shashthadeva conquered Goa, Port Gopakapattana and Kapardikadvipa and annexed a large part of South Konkan to his kingdom, making Gopakpattana his subsidiary capital. The next King, Jayakeshi I, further expanded the Goan kingdom. A Jain Sanskrit text, Dvayāśraya mentions the extension of his capital and that Port Gopakapattna had trade contacts with Zanzibar, Bengal, Gujarat and Sri Lanka. Gopakapattana was a pleasant commercial city, well connected with Old Goa and a trading hub for over 300 years. In the 1320s it was looted by Khalji general Malik Kafur. The Kadambas went back to Chandor, but returned to Gopakapattana when Muhammad bin Tughluq overcame Chandor.

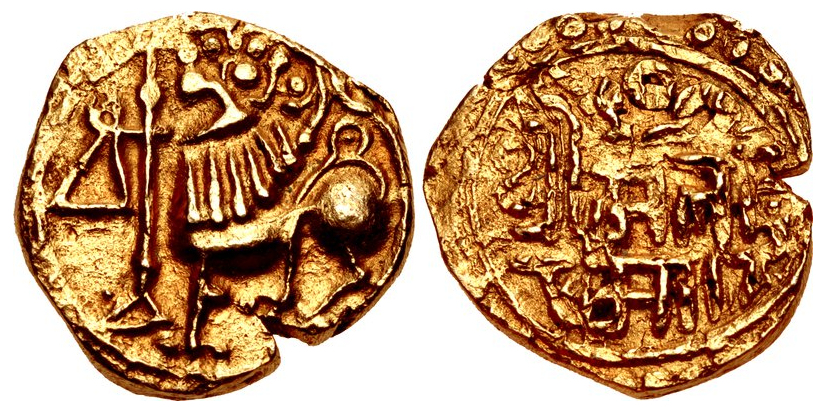
Kadambas of Goa. Anonymous. Circa 1240-1310 CE. Lion standing left; standard to left. Reverse: śri/ malaha/ ramari in Devanagari, "Conqueror of the Malavas".

== Administration ==
During the rule of the Kadambas, the name and fame of Goapuri reached its zenith. Goa's religion, culture, trade and arts flourished and the dynasty built many Shiva temples. They assumed titles like Konkanadhipati, Saptakotisha Ladbha Varaveera, Gopakapura varadhishva, Konkanmahacharavarti and Panchamahashabda. They married the royalty of Saurashtra and even local chieftains. The kings patronized the Vedic religion and performed major fire sacrifices (yagna) and Ashvamedha yagna. They popularized Hinduism and patronized Jainism.

The languages of Kadamba administration were Sanskrit and Kannada. They introduced the Kannada language to Goa, where it exercised a profound influence on the local language. The Nagari, Kadamba, Halekannada and Goykanadi scripts were very popular. It is known from another inscription that Tribhuvanamalla established a Brahmapuri at Gopaka. Brahmapuris were ancient universities run by Brahmins, where Vedas, astrology, philosophy, medicine, and other subjects were taught. They were found in Goa, Savoi verem, Gauli moula, and elsewhere.

Kadambas ruled Goa for more than 400 years. until 1345 CE.

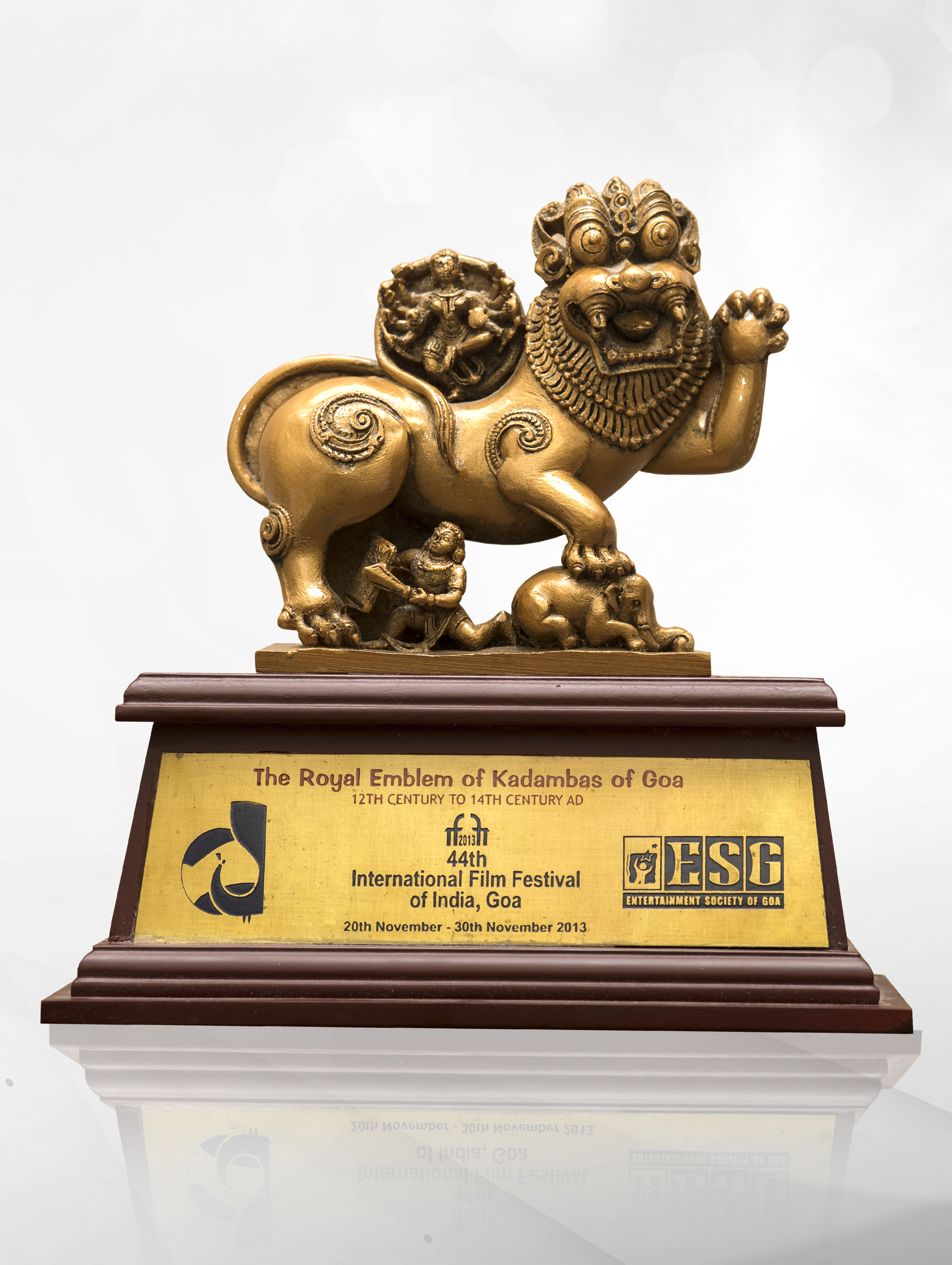
Royal emblem of Kadambas of Goa, on IFFI Award

== In popular culture ==
Goa Government-owned bus service is named after the Kadambas Dynasty and is known as Kadamba Transport Corporation. The royal lion emblem of the Kadambas is used a logo on its buses. The logo has been used since the corporation's inception in 1980.

On 31 May 2005 Defence minister of India Pranab Mukherjee commissioned India's most advanced and first dedicated military naval base named INS Kadamba in Karwar.

== See also ==
- History of Goa
- Kadamba dynasty
- Kadamba of Hangal
- Saptakoteshwar
