= Bhadreshwar Jain Temple =

Śvetāmbara Jain temple in Gujarat, India

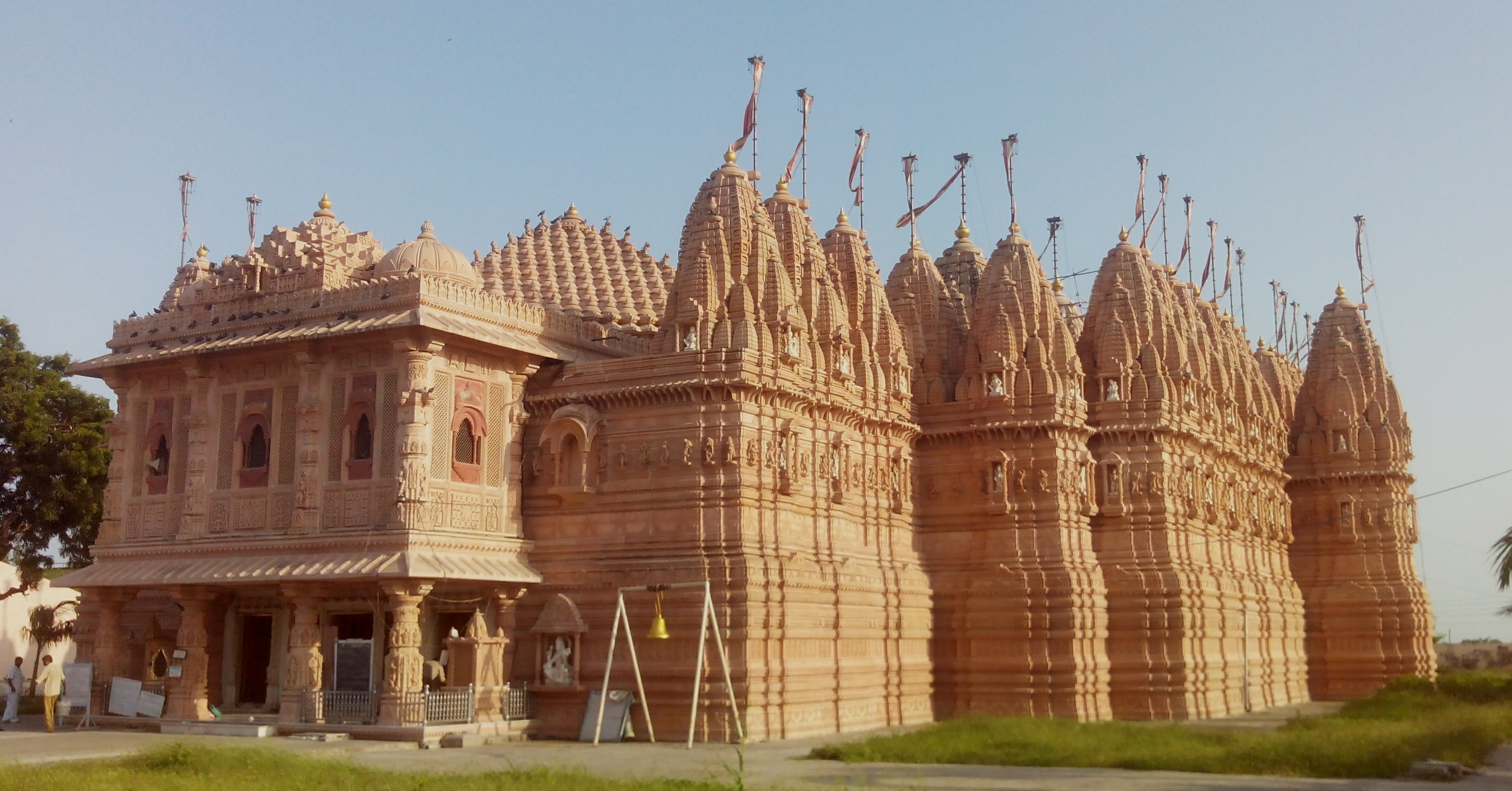
- Vasai Jain Temple

- Location within Gujarat

Religion
- Affiliation: Jainism
- Sect: Śvetāmbara
- Deity: Ajitanatha
- Festival: Mahavir Jayanti
- Governing body: Seth Vardhaman Kalyanji Trust

Location
- Location: Bhadresar, Kutch district, Gujarat, India
- Interactive map of Bhadreshwar Jain Temple
- Coordinates: 22°54′42.1″N 69°54′14″E

Architecture
- Temple: 1

Bhadreshwar Jain Temple, also known as Vasai Jain Temple, is a historical importance located in Bhadreshwar village of Mundra Taluka, Kutch, Gujarat, India.

== History ==
According to Bantvijaya Chronicles, a 19th-century Jain scripture composed by Acharya Bantvijaya, the temples date back to 516 BCE (Vira Nirvana Samvat 12) during the reign of Raja Siddhasen. The idol of Parshvanatha was installed by Shri Kapil Kevali Muni in the 5th century BCE. The temple was also renovated by King Samprati, of the Maurya dynasty, and installed stone idols elephant outside temple. The temple was later renovated by Vanaraja Chavda, Sarangadeva, Virasena and Harisen.

The first reference to this temple dates back to the 8th century. It is said a Jain layman named Devchandra laid the foundation stone of this temple centuries ago. The temple was renovated extensively by Jagdusha in 13th century. Since then, the temple has been renovated nine times and the temple plan expanded to include 52 dev-kulikas. However, the main shrines remain unchanged.

The temples have been destroyed many times due to natural calamities like earthquakes and the chronicles of Mistris of Kutch, mention that they were the architects and artisans, who renovated temples during the earthquakes of 1819, 1844–45 and 1875.

In the former temple, the lower part was considered the oldest, perhaps about 1170. The temple complex was expanded with the corridors, then the outer wings, then the shrine, and last of all the porch. The temple complex was again completely devastated in earthquake of 26 January 2001, however, it has now been completely rebuilt, as many of the old shrines were destroyed to the extent that it could not be rehabilitated and therefore completely new construction was necessitated.

== Architecture ==
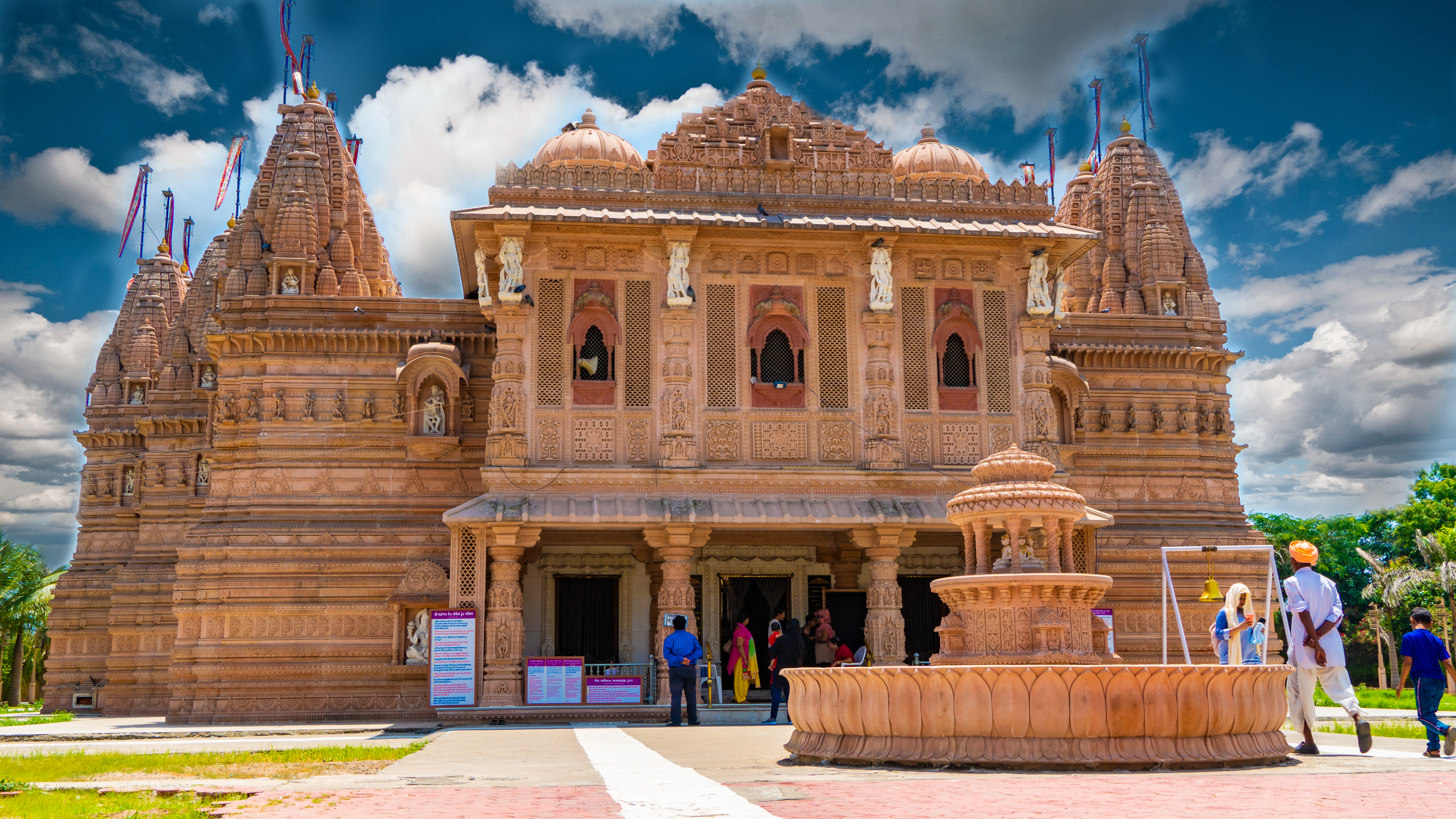
Entrance façade

The temple is notable for its architecture, beautiful marble idols and intricate carvings. The temple follows the plan of the Dilwara Temples, Mount Abu. The temple is built in Sekhari school of architecture. The main shrines is a 48 by 85 feet (15 by 26 m) structure standing at the end courtyard and surrounded by 52 sub-shrines with a corridor in front. The principal shrine features three pillared domes. On the east entrance of the temple is a porch with another large dome. A low screen wall separates antarala, mandapa, and the entrance of the temple. At the southwest corner and behind the cells on the left side is a row of chambers with cellars entered by lifting flagstones on the floor. In the shrine are three white marble images. The central vedi enshrines an image of Ajitnatha (1565 CE), with the images of Shantinatha (1175 CE) and a seven-hooded image of Parshvanatha (1175 CE) on either side. On the extreme left of the main vedi is an idol of Tirthankara seated with devi and an image of the Shamla (transl. black) Parshvanatha right.

The temple premises includes modern structures and a dharamshala.

== See also ==
- Kumbharia Jain temples
- Ranakpur Jain temple
- Shantinath Jain temple, Kothara
