= Ranna (Kannada poet) =

Kannada poet (949–1020)

- Born: Ranna; 949; Belagali, Bagalkot, Chalukya Empire
- Died: 1020 (aged 70–71)
- Occupation: Kannada Poet
- Notable work: Sahasa Bhima Vijaya (Gadayuddha)
- Parents: Jinavallabha (father); Abbalabbe (mother)

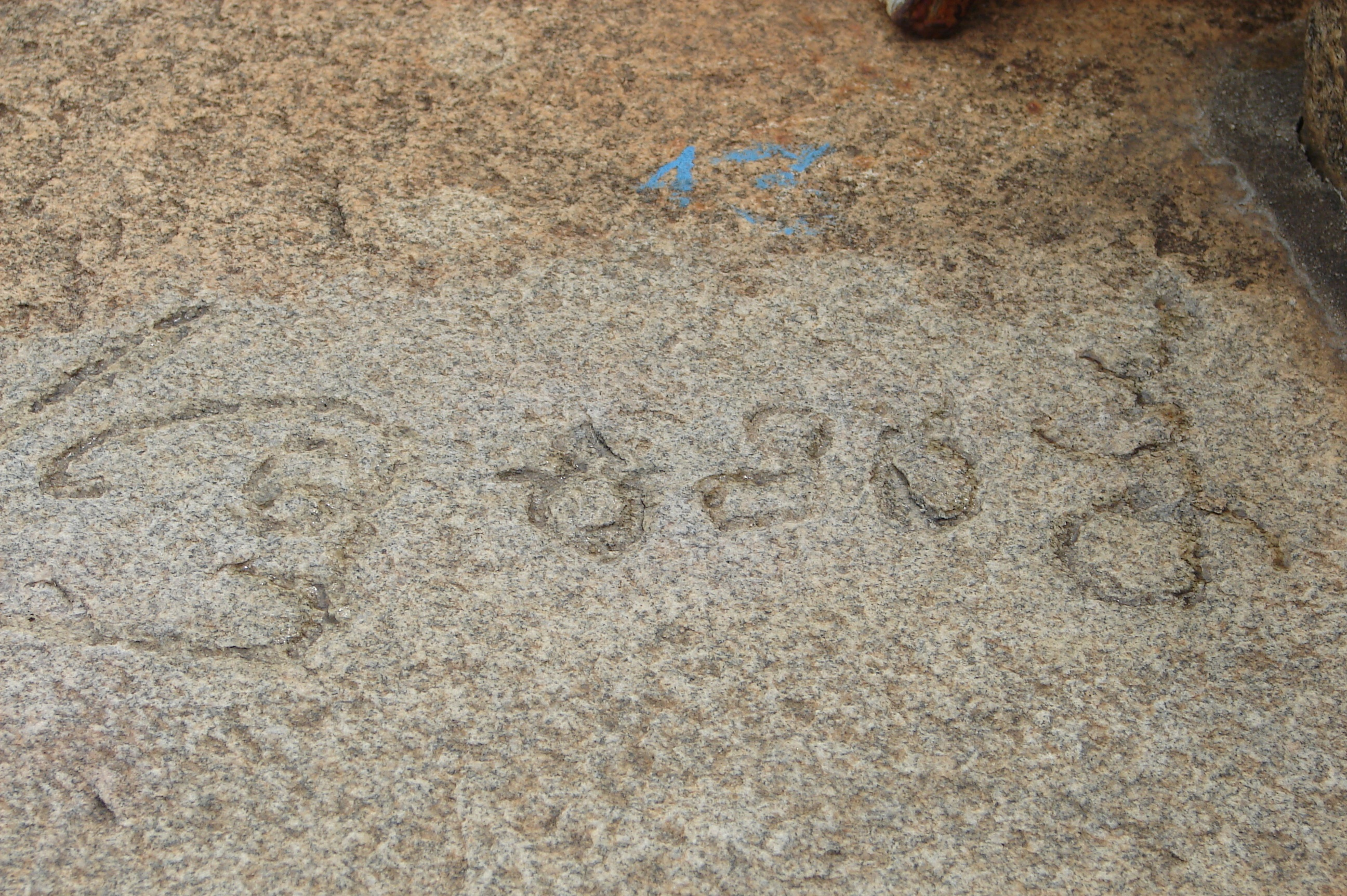
Inscrbed handwriting (in Kannada characters) of Ranna reads Kavi Ratna ("gem among poets") at Shravanabelagola

Ranna (c. 949–1020) was one of the earliest and most celebrated Kannada poets, regarded as one of the "three gems" (Ratnatraya) of classical Kannada literature along with Adikavi Pampa and Ponna (poet) He flourished in the Western Chalukya court of Tailapa II and his successor Satyashraya, in what is now Karnataka, India. Ranna is renowned for his sophisticated style, martial themes, and deep Jain influence. He is best known for his two major surviving works: "Sahasa Bhima Vijaya" (also known as "Gadayuddha") and "Ajitha Purana" (Ajitanatha purana) about the second tirthankar of Jainism.

== Early life and background ==
Ranna was born around 949 in a Kannada Jain family, likely in the region of modern Karnataka. Details about his birthplace vary, with traditions suggesting Mudhol (in present-day Bagalkot district) as a probable location. He was a devout Jain and his literary works often reflect Jain ethics and philosophy. Ranna received patronage from Western Chalukya rulers, notably Tailapa II and his successor Satyashraya, which allowed him to produce major literary works in courtly settings.

== Literature ==
During his early days as a writer, Ranna may have been patronized by Chavundaraya (or Chavundaraya), the famous minister of the Western Ganga Dynasty. With the rise of the imperial Western Chalukya Empire, Ranna became an important poet in the court of King Tailapa II and his successor King Satyashraya who bestowed upon him the title Kavi Chakravarti (lit, "Emperor among poets").

The writings of Ranna are in Halegannada (lit, "old Kannada"). Of the five known major works accomplished by him, two are available in full and one in part. They are: Ajitha purana(Ajitanatha purana), Parashuramacharithe (extinct), Saahasabhima Vijaya (also known as Gadaayuddha), Rannakanda and Chakresvaracharite (extinct).

Ajitha Purana (Ajitanatha Purana) (993 C.E.) is a Jain champu (a form of composition) purana written in twelve sections on the life of Ajitanatha, the second Tirthankar of Jainism. Ranna wrote this purana under the patronage of a Jain lady called Attimabbe, the wife of general Nagavarma. RannaKanda (990 C.E.), so called because it is written in the Kanda meter, is the earliest extant dictionary in the Kannada language. Only twelve sections of this writing are available. Parusharama Charite (around 980 C.E.) is a eulogy of the Ganga minister and commander Chamundaraya. The poet held his patron in such high esteem that he claims to have named his son "raya" in honor of his patron (who had the honorific Samara Parashurama).

Saahasabhimavijaya or Gadayuddha (lit, "The duel of maces") is undoubtedly Ranna's magnum opus that was accomplished in an age of writings on "heroism", that describe the valor of important personalities (vira rasa and roudrarasa). Completed on 27 October 982 (though some scholars believe it was a product of a more youthful Ranna), it is one of the enduring classics of the language where the poet compares the valor of his patron Chalukya King Satyashraya to the Pandava prince Bhima of the Hindu epic Mahabharata. Ranna keeps with the trend started by Adikavi Pampa who in 941 C.E. compared his patron Chalukya King Arikesari (a Rashtrakuta vassal) to the Pandava prince Arjuna in the classic Vikramarjunavijaya (also called Pampa Bharata). While acknowledging that Ranna may have found some inspiration from earlier writings such as Urubhanga of Bhasa and Venisamhara or Bhattanarayana, scholars concede that Gadayuddha has an originality of its own. Modern scholars see similarities between Ranna's usage of the "adult imps" (called murulgal) that stalk the battlefield of Kurukshetra and warn Kaurava prince Duryodhana (Bhima's adversary in battle) about his impending death, and the description of witches by latter day famed English playwright, Shakespeare. Some scholars believe that Gadayuddha may have been conceived as a play before being completed as a champukavya (epic poem in kavya style and champu meter).

While the theme of the narration centers around the battle of maces between Bhima and Duryodhana on the last day of the eighteen-day war, the poet uses a technique similar to flashbacks in modern cinema to enlighten the reader with important events that led to the war and those events that transpired on the battlefield. Bhima is undoubtedly the hero of the day for slaying his foe and thus avenging the insult suffered by his wife Draupadi at the hands of Dushshasana (Duryodhana's brother) prior to the war. However, Ranna skillfully depicts Duryodhana as a "great soul" (mahanubhava), who despite his sins, was a brave kshatriya on the battlefield, and a true friend to Karna (another important character in the epic).

== See also ==
- Adikavi Pampa
- Akka Mahadevi
- Kuvempu
- Sri Ponna
