= Ajitanatha =

Second Tirthankara in Jainism

- 2nd Jain Tirthankara
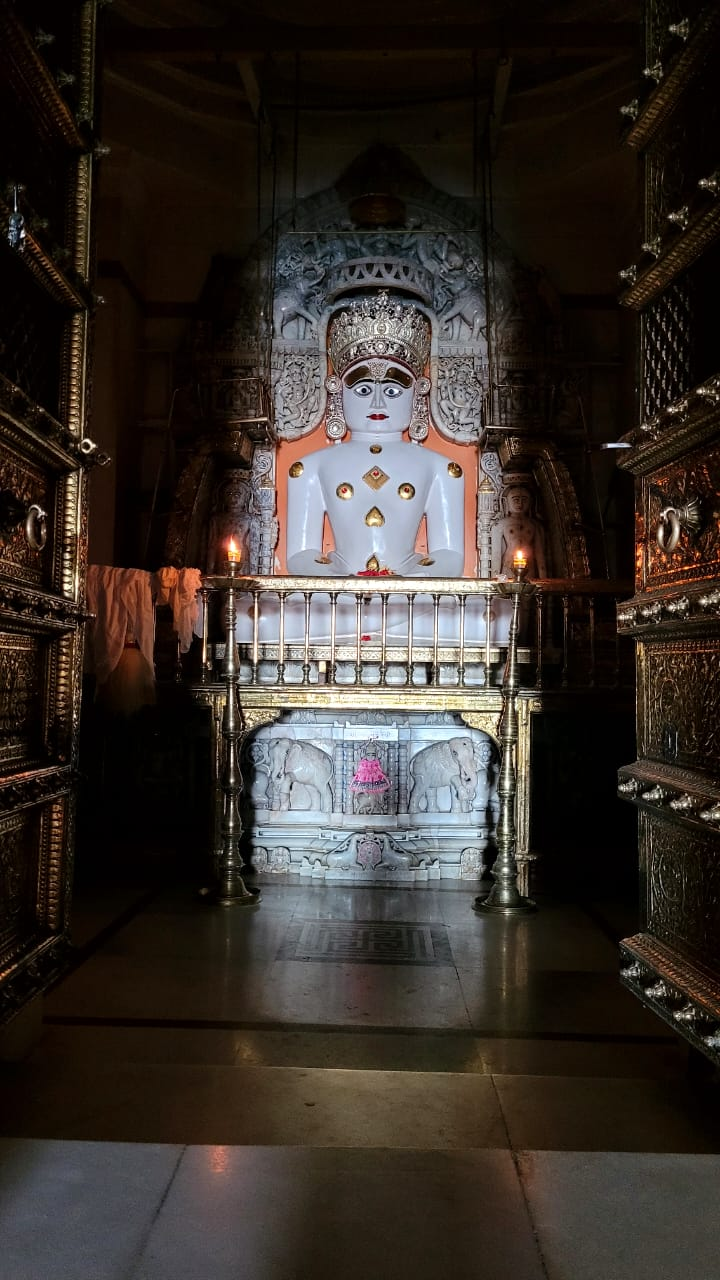
- Tirthankara Ajitnatha at Shri Ajitnath Bhagwan Shwetamber Jain Derasar, Taranga
- Venerated in: Jainism
- Predecessor: Rishabhanatha
- Successor: Sambhavanatha
- Symbol: Elephant
- Height: 450 dhanush (1,350 meters)
- Age: 72 lakh purvas (508.032 × 10^{18} years old)
- Tree: Saptaparna (Alstonia scholaris)
- Color: Golden

Genealogy
- Born: Ayodhya
- Parents: Jitaśatru (father); Vijayādevī (mother)
- Siblings: Sagara (step-brother/cousin)
- Dynasty: Ikṣvākuvaṁśa

Ajitanatha (Sanskrit: अजितनाथ, lit. 'invincible' or 'unconquerable') is venerated as the second tirthankara of the current cosmic age (avasarpini) in Jainism. According to Jain universal history, he was born into the ancient Ikshvaku dynasty to King Jitashatru and Queen Vijaya in the revered city of Ayodhya. Following a period of royal life, traditional accounts describe him renouncing his kingdom to become an ascetic, eventually attaining omniscience (Kevala Jnana) and establishing a massive four-part monastic order. He ultimately achieved spiritual liberation from the cycle of rebirth (moksha) on the sacred peaks of Mount Shikharji in modern-day Jharkhand.

In Jain art and iconography, Ajitanatha is traditionally depicted in a meditative posture with a golden physical complexion. He is distinctly identified by his unique iconographic emblem, the elephant, which is typically carved onto the pedestal of his idols. Beyond physical monuments, his life and teachings have profoundly influenced medieval Jain literature; most notably, he is the subject of the 10th-century Kannada poetic epic Ajitha purana composed by Ranna, as well as the foundational devotional text, the Ajitashanti Stotra.

As a foundational figure in Jain theology, Ajitanatha is actively venerated across the Indian subcontinent. Major architectural monuments and pilgrimage centers dedicated to his worship span multiple regions, including the highly significant Mathura Chaurasi complex in Uttar Pradesh, the spectacularly carved 12th-century Taranga Jain temple in Gujarat, and the classic Chaturmukha Basadi in Karnataka.

== Life and legends ==
According to Jain tradition, Ajitanatha is venerated as the second tirthankara of the present cosmic age (avasarpini). Jain universal history states that he was born into the ancient Ikshvaku dynasty to King Jitashatru and Queen Vijaya in the revered city of Ayodhya (also historically referred to in texts as Saketa or Vinita) on magha-shukla-dashmi of lunisolar Jain calendar. Within the expansive framework of Jain cosmology, texts attribute to him a symbolic lifespan of 72,000,000 purvas and a towering physical height of 450 bows (dhanushas). Jain narratives also closely associate his era with his younger cousin, King Sagara, who is celebrated across ancient Indian traditions as the second universal monarch (Chakravartin).

His name, Ajita, translates from Sanskrit to "invincible" or "unconquerable." According to traditional accounts, particularly those codified by the 12th-century Jain scholar Hemachandra in the Trishashthi Shalaka Purusha Charitra, he received this name due to a legend surrounding his conception. The texts state that while Ajitanatha was in his mother's womb, Queen Vijaya's aura became invincible, allowing her to repeatedly defeat King Jitashatru in games of dice. Uttarapurana, a Digambara text, explains that he was named Ajita because he could not be defeated by sins or all heretics.

Following a period of ruling his kingdom, traditional narratives describe Ajitanatha renouncing worldly attachments to become an ascetic. He is said to have attained omniscience (Kevala Jnana) while meditating under a saptaparna tree (Alstonia scholaris). After achieving enlightenment, he established a massive four-part monastic order (sangha), which was reportedly led by 90 chief disciples (ganadharas), with Simhasena acting as the principal leader. Falgu (according to Śvetāmbara tradition) or Prakubja (according to Digambara tradition) was a chief of his order of the nuns. Following a long period of preaching the doctrines of Jainism, he ultimately achieved liberation from the cycle of rebirth (moksha) on chaitra-shukla-panchmi of lunisolar Jain calendar on the sacred peaks of Mount Shikharji in modern-day Jharkhand. While the specific name "Ajita" occasionally appears in early Vedic texts such as the Yajurveda, modern Indologists generally attribute this to shared ancient Indian nomenclature rather than definitive historical proof of the tirthankara.

Ajitanatha is said to have been born 50 lakh crore sagara after his predecessor, Rishabhanatha. His successor, Sambhavanatha, is said to have been born 30 lakh crore sagara after him.

== Iconography ==
In Jain art and sculpture, Ajitanatha is traditionally depicted in a meditative posture and is distinctly identified by his golden physical complexion. He is explicitly recognized by his unique iconographic emblem, the elephant, which is typically carved or stamped onto the pedestal beneath his idols. As with all tirthankaras, he is depicted alongside his dedicated guardian deities (Shashan-devatas). According to both the Digambara and Śvētāmbara traditions, his accompanying male guardian deity (yaksha) is Mahayaksha. However, sectarian texts differ regarding his female guardian (yakshi), with the Digambara sect identifying her as Rohini and the Śvētāmbara sect identifying her as Ajita. Furthermore, traditional Jain iconographic texts note that Ajitanatha's elephant emblem also serves as the customary mount (vahana) for these specific guardian deities.

=== Ancient idols and artifacts ===
The second tirthankara, Ajitanatha, is prominently featured in the Akota hoard recovered in Gujarat. Documented by art historian Umakant Premanand Shah, this excavation yielded post-Gupta era bronzes of Ajitanatha dating from the 6th to 8th centuries CE. These well-preserved idols highlight the continuous metallurgical casting traditions of the Maitraka era and the established iconography of Ajitanatha in western India.

== Literature ==
Ajitanatha is the subject of highly significant medieval Jain literature. Most notably, the Ajitha purana, a major Kannada poetic epic composed by the prominent scholar Ranna in 993 CE, provides a detailed and celebrated account of his life and teachings. Furthermore, the Ajitashanti Stotra, authored by the revered ascetic Nandisena in the 7th century, remains a fundamental devotional text. It is heavily utilized within the Śvētāmbara tradition and simultaneously praises the spiritual accomplishments of both Ajitanatha and the 16th tirthankara, Shantinatha.

== Temples and legacy ==
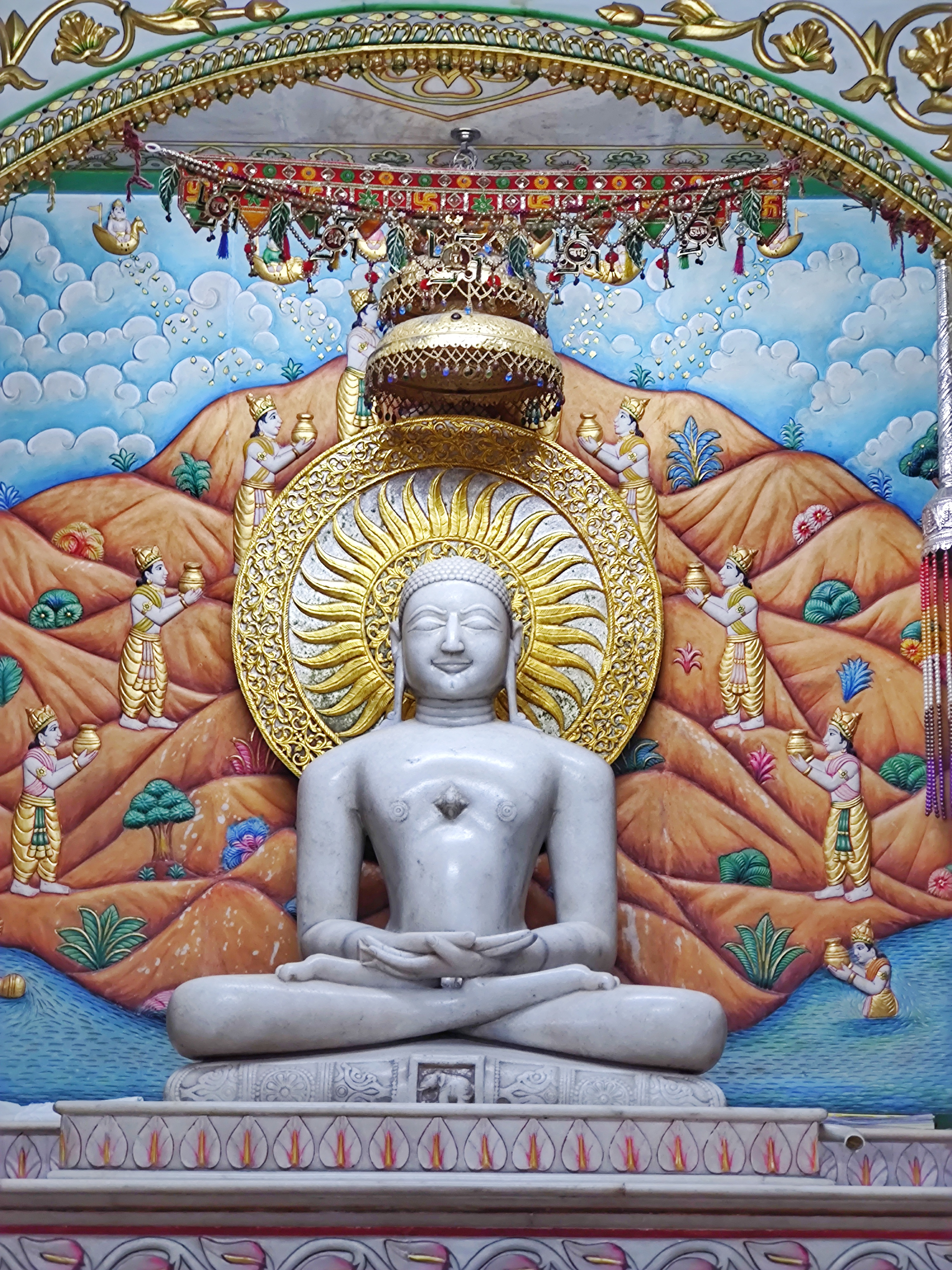
Ajitanatha idol at Mathura Chaurasi Jain temple, Uttar Pradesh

As the second tirthankara, Ajitanatha is actively venerated across the Indian subcontinent, resulting in the construction of massive architectural monuments and dedicated pilgrimage centers.

=== Places of birth and liberation ===
In Jainism, Sammed Shikharji (located on Parasnath Hill in Jharkhand) serves as the geographical location where 20 of the 24 tirthankaras attained liberation. According to Jain texts, Ajitanatha attained ultimate spiritual liberation at this site alongside 1,000 other ascetic monks. The specific hilltop shrine (tonk) dedicated to his liberation is known as Siddhavar Koot. Instead of a traditional idol, this tonk enshrines his footprints (charan), which are actively worshipped by pilgrims from both the Digambara and Śvētāmbara sects.

=== Other temples ===
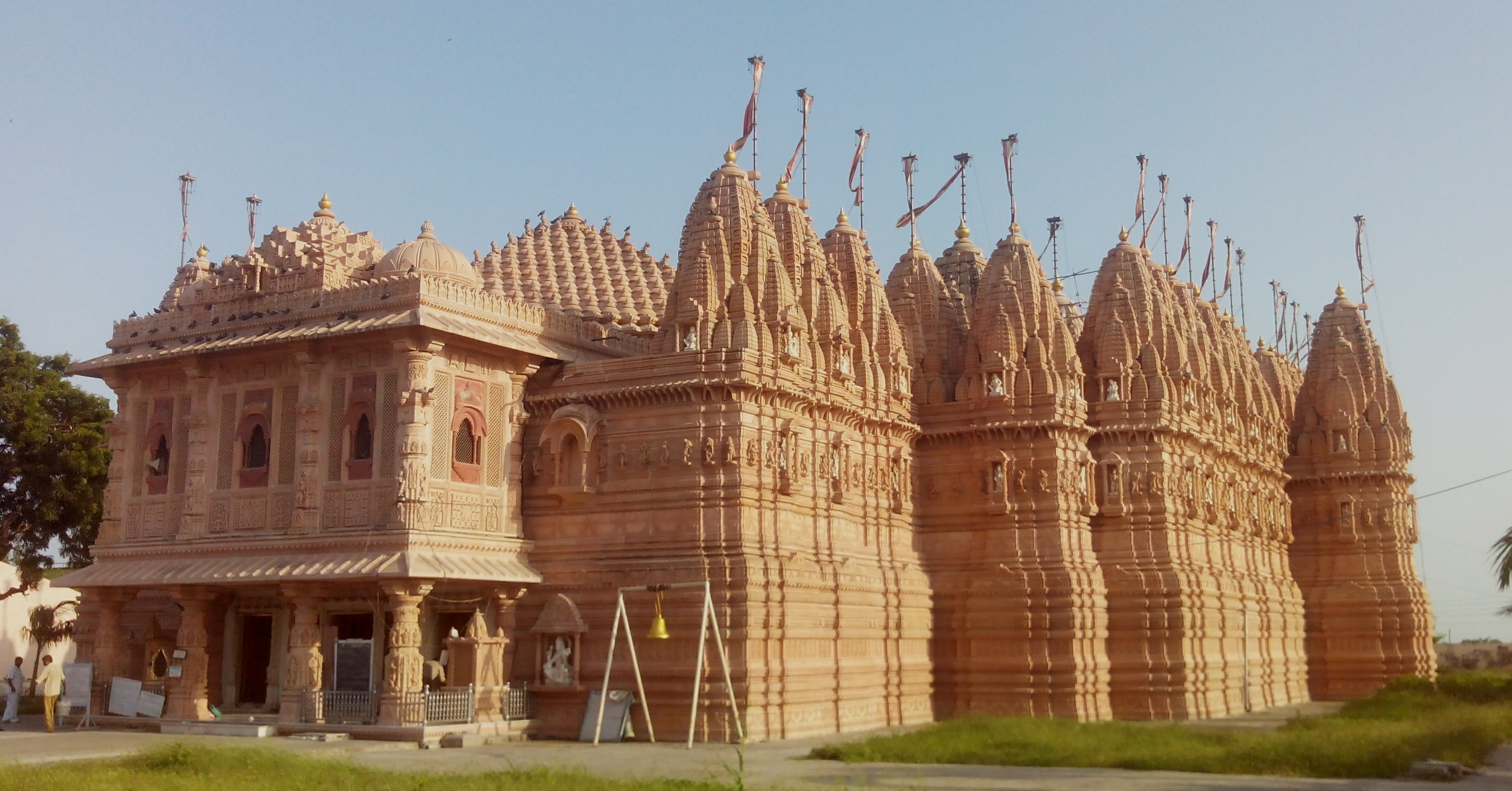
Vasai Jain Temple

In northern India, the Mathura Chaurasi Digamber Jain Mandir in Uttar Pradesh stands as a premier center for his worship. This highly significant temple complex features a prominent white marble idol of Ajitanatha as its primary enshrined deity (moolnayak), which was historically recovered during an archaeological excavation in Gwalior. The site is also deeply revered within Jain universal history as the exact location where Jambuswami (the final omniscient being, or Kevali, of the current cosmic age) attained ultimate liberation (moksha), with his venerated footprints (charan) actively worshipped alongside Ajitanatha's idol.

In western India, the Taranga Jain temple in Gujarat stands as one of the most historically significant Śvētāmbara pilgrimage sites dedicated to his worship. This spectacular monument was notably expanded in the 12th century (1161 CE) by the Chaulukya monarch Kumarapala, who constructed its prominent main hall (rangamandapa). Gujarat is also home to the ancient Vasai Jain Temple in Bhadresar, which serves as another crucial regional center for his veneration.

In central India, the Bandhaji temple complex in Madhya Pradesh operates as a major pilgrimage destination for the Digambara sect, anchoring his historic worship in the region. Moving to southern India, his legacy is marked by the Chaturmukha Basadi, Gerusoppa, Karnataka. Constructed during the 16th century, this classic four-faced stone monument highlights his enduring veneration in Dravidian Jain architecture.

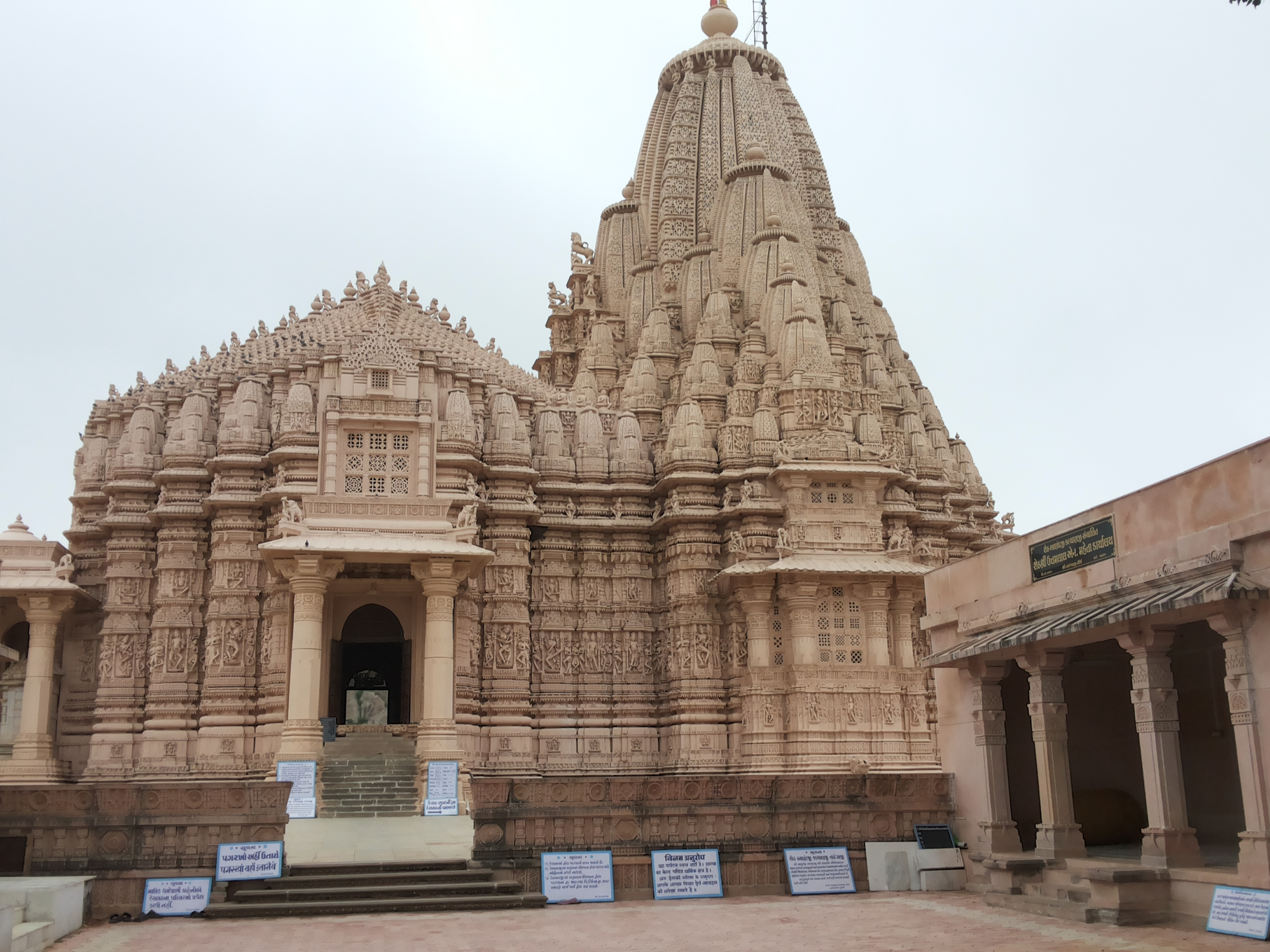
Taranga, Gujarat (1121 AD) constructed by King Kumarapala

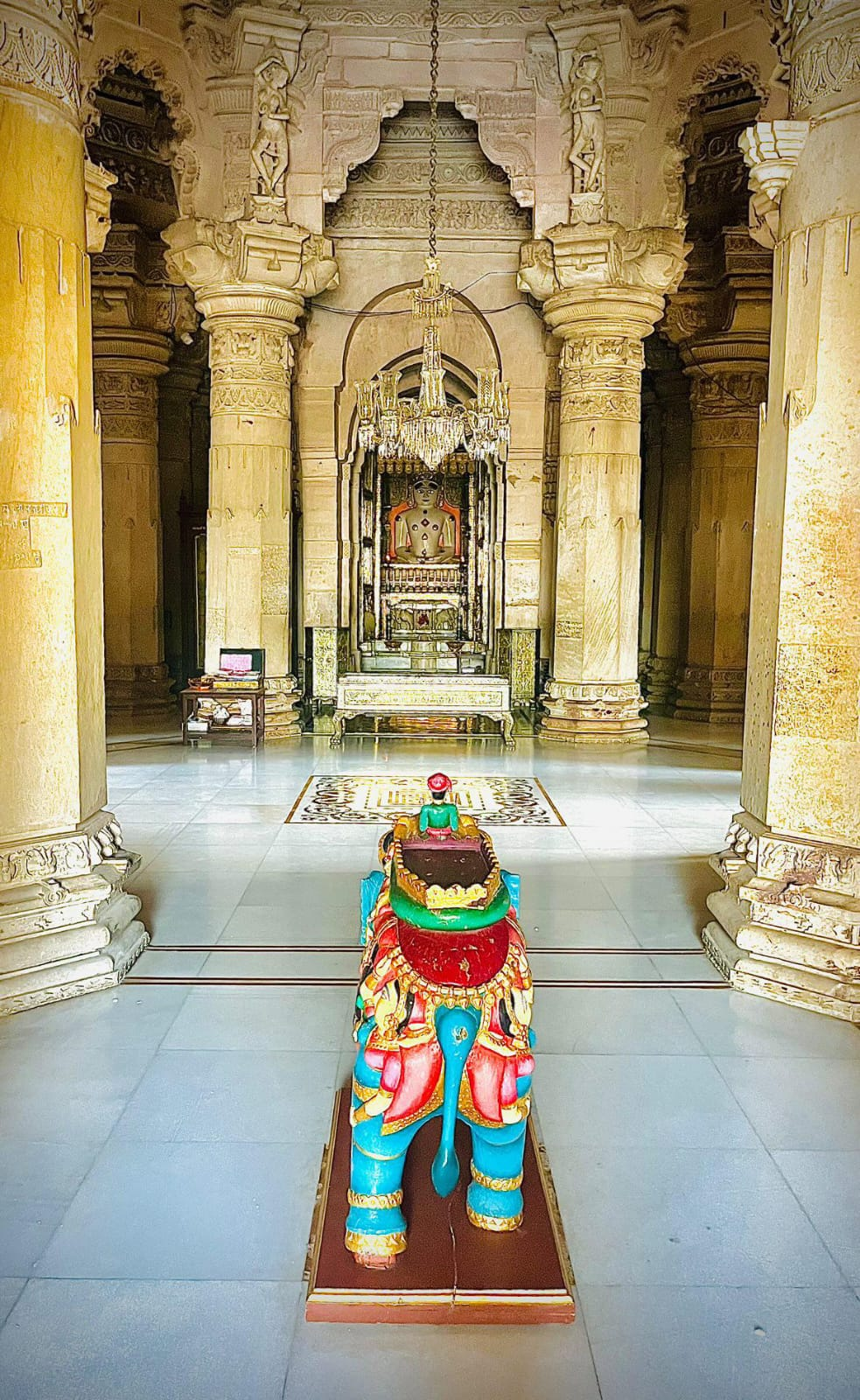
Rang mandapa of the Svetambara Jain Temple at Taranga which was originally constructed by Kumarpala in 1161

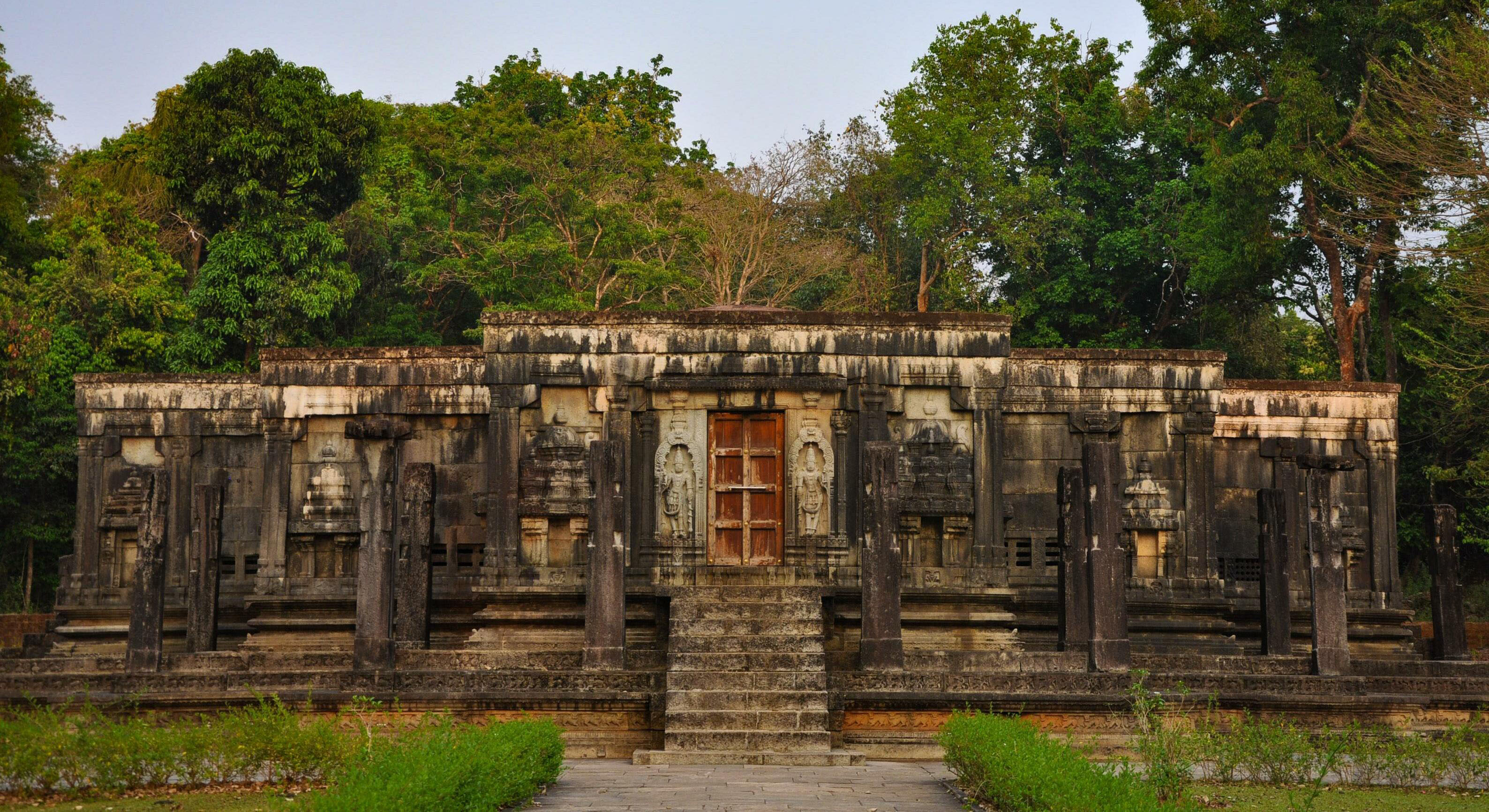
Chaturmukha Basadi, Gerusoppa

== See also ==
- Arihant (Jainism)
