= Nanadesis =

Guild of traders in early India

The Nanadesis were a guild of traders who organized themselves into one of the biggest of the trading associations at the time of the Hoysala Empire. They developed significant trade contact with many areas, including foreign countries such as Malaya, Magadha, Kosala, Nepal, and Persia. They were respected in their communities and were generous in their grants to temples and mathas. The term Nanadesi means "traders from other kingdoms" while nagaram was used for local merchants. It was also a famous guild in 8th Century
