= Ajitha purana =

Information
- Religion: Jainism
- Author: Ranna
- Period: 993 CE

The Ajita Purana was written by Ranna in 993 CE narrates the story of Ajitanatha, the second tirthankara of Jainism. This is the shortest jinapurana in the Kannada language. It narrates two stories of the previous births of the tirthankara.

== Story plot ==
The first part opens with a prince named Vimalavahana who is overcome by an intense feeling of renunciation upon beholding a few strands of gray hairs on his cheek. The grey hair remind him of the transitoriness of life and the supreme power and inevitability of death. He takes to a life of meditation and is born as a Dev in one of the heavens. In his subsequent birth he becomes Ajithanatha, the king of Ayodhya. The customary fivefold auspicious in the life of a Thirthankara have been described at great length by Ranna with his usual gusts and devotion and piety. He was subject to intense emotional disturbances and did not know how to control them except by giving them to eloquent expression in words.

The second part deals with the story of Sagara, the second Chakravarti of Jainism who is deeply attached to all worldly pleasures. His friend Maniketu tries his best to turn the attention of the king towards renunciation but could not succeed. Finally he contrived a plan by which the 60,000 sons of Sagara were killed and in the guise of an old man with a dead son in his arms presented himself before the king and begged of him to enliven the child by fighting with death. Sagara felt helpless in the matter and said that death was no respecter of persons and all must suffer sorrow and pain.

There upon Maniketu revealed to him the simultaneous death of his sons. Sagara was overcome with grief but bore it heroically and taking to a life of penance realized him in the end. Ranna has depicted this story in all its pathos and the character of Maniketu in the role of hold man bereaved of his son is the center of interest. The above are the finest parts of his work and when compared with the corresponding parts of the Sanskrit original the improvements made by Ranna can be appreciated. The feature of Ajitha - Purana is the portrait of Attimabbe painted with grateful devotion by Ranna. She was a pious and dutiful Jaina lady famous for her generosity in extending patronage to poets, in erecting temples to the Jina, and in the propagation of Jaina texts. An inscription at Lakkigundi in Dharwar district, probably written by Ranna gives a few more details concerning her religious life. It was for her sake that Ranna wrote the Ajitapurana. Her personality was so pure and noble that the poet has compared her to the sacred waters of the Ganges and to a leap of Snow-White cotton.
