= List of Jain states and dynasties =

List of royalties following Jainism

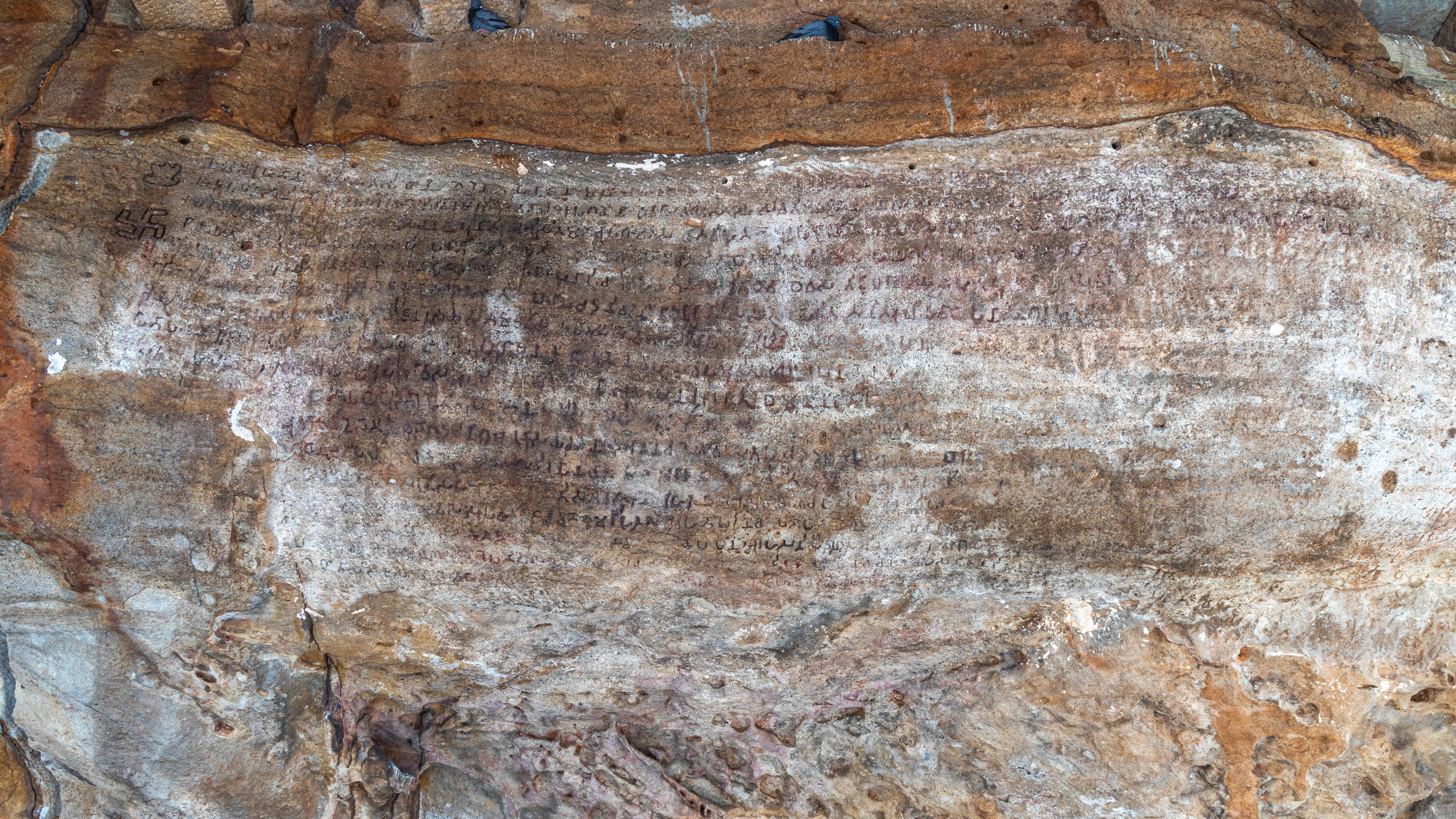
Hāthigumphā inscription of Jain King Kharavela

This is a list of monarchs, royalties, and dynasties following Jainism.

== Dynasties ==
- Ikshvaku dynasty:Thritkaras as twenty-two of twenty-four Tirthankaras were born in this dynasty.
- Harivamsa
- Vajjika League (c. 6th century BCE - c. 468 BCE)
- Pandya dynasty (6th century BCE - 1345 CE) Originally Jains, later converted to Hinduism during koon pandya's rule)
- Maurya dynasty (322-184 BCE)
- Mahameghavahana dynasty (250s BCE – 5th century CE)
- Vakataka dynasty (250 CE - 510 CE)
- Chera dynasty (300 BCE - 550 CE)
- Kalabhra dynasty (300-700 CE)
- Kadamba Dynasty (345–525 CE)
- Alupa Dynasty (200-1444 CE)
- Western Ganga Dynasty (350 CE – 1000)
- Chalukyas of Badami (543 CE - 753 CE)
- Santara dynasty (7th century CE - 18th century CE)
- Rastrakuta dynasty (735CE-982 CE)
- Shilahara Dynasty (8th century CE–13th century CE)
- Kakatiya dynasty (800CE-1323CE)
- Ratta dynasty (900-1300)
- Musunuri Nayakas (1050CE-1438CE)
- Seuna (Yadava) dynasty (860CE-1317CE)
- Chalukyas of Kalyani (957 CE - 1184 CE)
- Hoysalas (1000 CE - 1346 CE)
- Kalachuri dynasty (600-1181 CE)
- Chowta dynasty (12th century CE-18th century CE)

== Historical Jain Kings ==
- Asvasena (Early 9th century BCE)
- Parshvanatha (9th century BCE)
- Avakinnayo Karakandu (9th century BCE)
- Raja Siddhartha (Early 6th century BCE)
- Mahavira (6th century BCE)
- Raja Shrenik (6th century BCE)
- Pandukabhaya(4th century BCE)
- Chandragupta Maurya(4th century BCE)
- Netunceliyan I (3rd century BCE)
- Kharavela (2nd century BCE)
- Samprati (3rd century BCE)
- Ajatashatru (5th century BCE)
- Kumarapala (r. 1143-1172)
- Āma (8, 9th centuries)
- Perum Cheral Irumporai (1st century CE)
- Bimbisara (c. 558 - c. 491 BC)
- Pulakeshin II (7th century CE)
- Harivarma (6th century CE)
- Ravivarma (6th century CE)
- Mrigeshavarma (5th century CE)
- Kakusthavarma (5th century CE)
- Avinita (5th century CE)
- Durvinita (6th century CE)
- Dantidurga (8th century CE)
- Krishna I (8th century CE)
- Govinda II (8th century CE)
- Govinda III (late 8th century CE)
- Amoghavarsha (9th century)
- Marasimha II Satyavakya (10th century CE)
- Gandaraditya (10th century CE)
- Indra IV (10th century CE)
- Mularaja II (12th century)
- Ereyanga (12th century)
- Veera Ballala I (12th century)
- Ramagupta (late 4th century CE)
- Bittideva (Originally Jain later supported vaishnavism) (12th century CE)
- Shalishuka (r. c. 215 - c. 202 BC)
- Ilango Adigal (2nd century CE)
- Udayin(460-444 BC)
- Vatsaraja (8th century CE)
- King Sodasa (1st century BCE)
- Chetaka (6th century BCE)
- Vanaraja Chavda (8th century CE)

== Queens ==
- Attimabbe
- Shantala Devi
- Abbakka Chowta (r. 1525-1570s)
- Rani Chennabhairadevi

== Kings in Jain texts ==
This list contains rulers that are mentioned in Jain texts. They are listed as follows:

- Bharata chakravartin
- Bahubali
- King Sagara
- Sanat Kumara Chakravarti
- Samudravijaya
- Nimi
- Nagnajit
- Rama
- Nabhiraja

== See also ==
- Jainism
- History of India
- List of Hindu empires and dynasties
