= Chaturmukha Basadi, Gerusoppa =

Jain temple in Karnataka, India

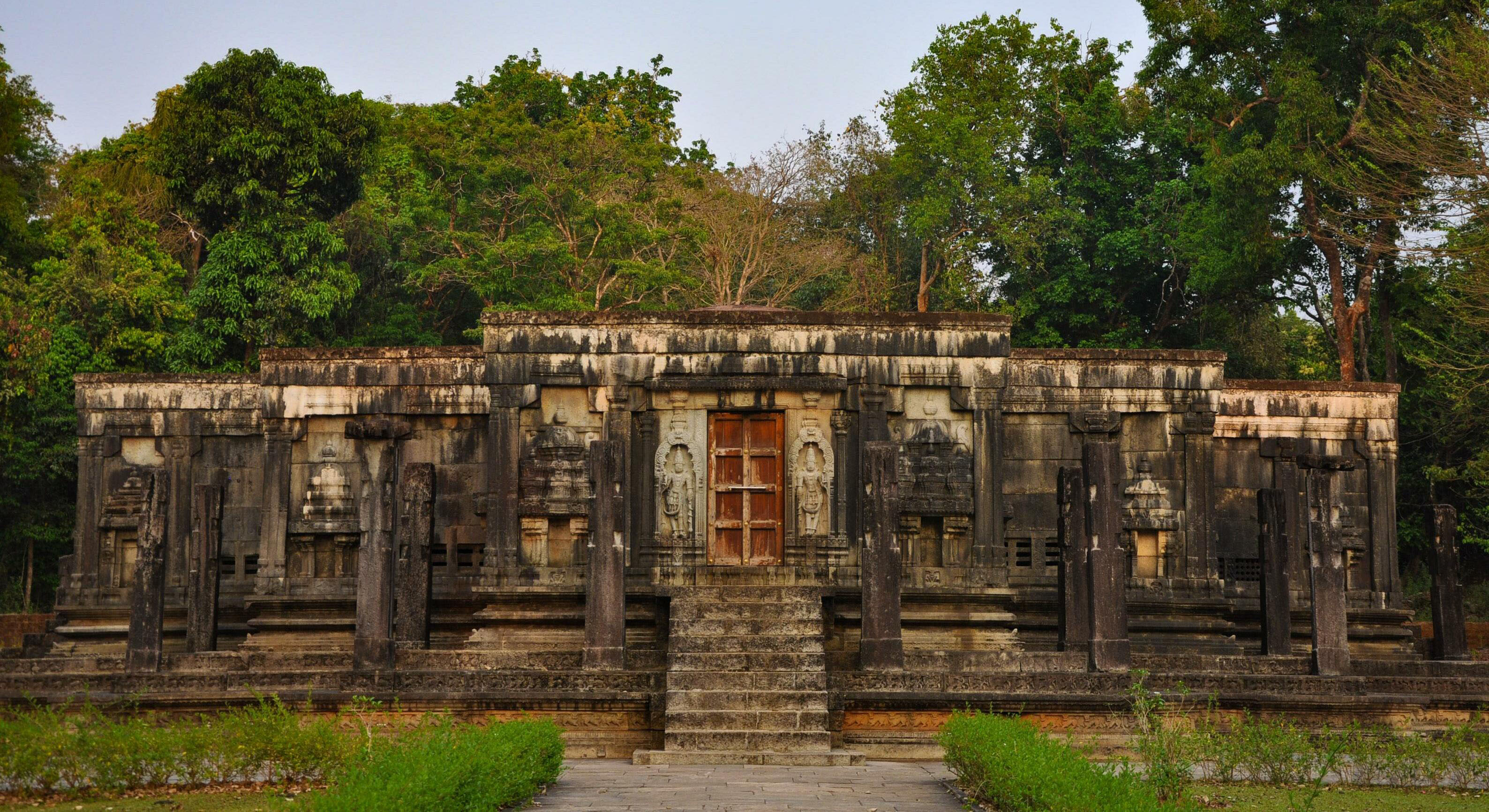
- Chaturmukha Basadi

- Location within Karnataka

Religion
- Affiliation: Jainism
- Sect: Digambara
- Deity: Rishabhanatha, Ajitanatha, Sambhavanatha and Abhinandananatha
- Festival: Mahavir Jayanti

Location
- Location: Gerusoppa, Karnataka
- Coordinates: 14°13′43.4″N 74°39′53″E

Architecture
- Style: Western Chalukya architecture
- Creator: Rani Chennabhairadevi
- Established: 1562

Specifications
- Temple: 5
- Materials: Grey granite

Chaturmukha Basadi is a symmetrical Jain temple located in Gerusoppa in Honnavar Taluk of Uttara Kannada district in the Indian state of Karnataka. The temple was constructed in 1562 during the reign of Rani Chennabhairadevi.

== History ==
Gerusoppa was a Jain capital during 1409–1610 CE ruled by the Saluva dynasty of the Vijayanagara Empire. Gerusoppa, historically associated with Nagire, became an important centre of Jain political power and religious patronage in coastal Karnataka. The Saluva chiefs who ruled the region were patrons of Jainism, and a number of Jain monuments and inscriptions survive from their period of rule. It is said that 1,084 temples existed in the region, but were destroyed and presently only six remain. In 1865, the veranda roof, the spire and the floor slabs were carted away by tehsildars from Honnavar for construction of another temple. The Chaturmukha Basadi is the principal temple in the Gerusoppa.

An inscription dated the 16th century mentions Rani Chennabhairadevi's (popularly called the "Pepper Queen") (Note: Chennabhairadevi ruled over 57 years and is considered the longest reigning Indian queen.) ascension to power. The chaturmukha temple was constructed in 1562 CE during the reign of Chennabhairadevi.

Chennabhairadevi ruled Gerusoppa during the second half of the 16th century and was a Jain ruler whose reign coincided with an important period of Jain religious and cultural patronage in the region. The temple therefore belongs to the late medieval phase of Jain architecture in coastal Karnataka, considerably later than the architectural tradition from which some of its stylistic features were derived. Gerusoppa also received royal patronage from the Hoysala Empire.

== Architecture ==
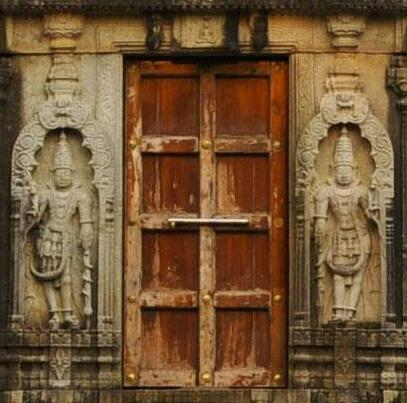
Dvarapalas on temple entrance

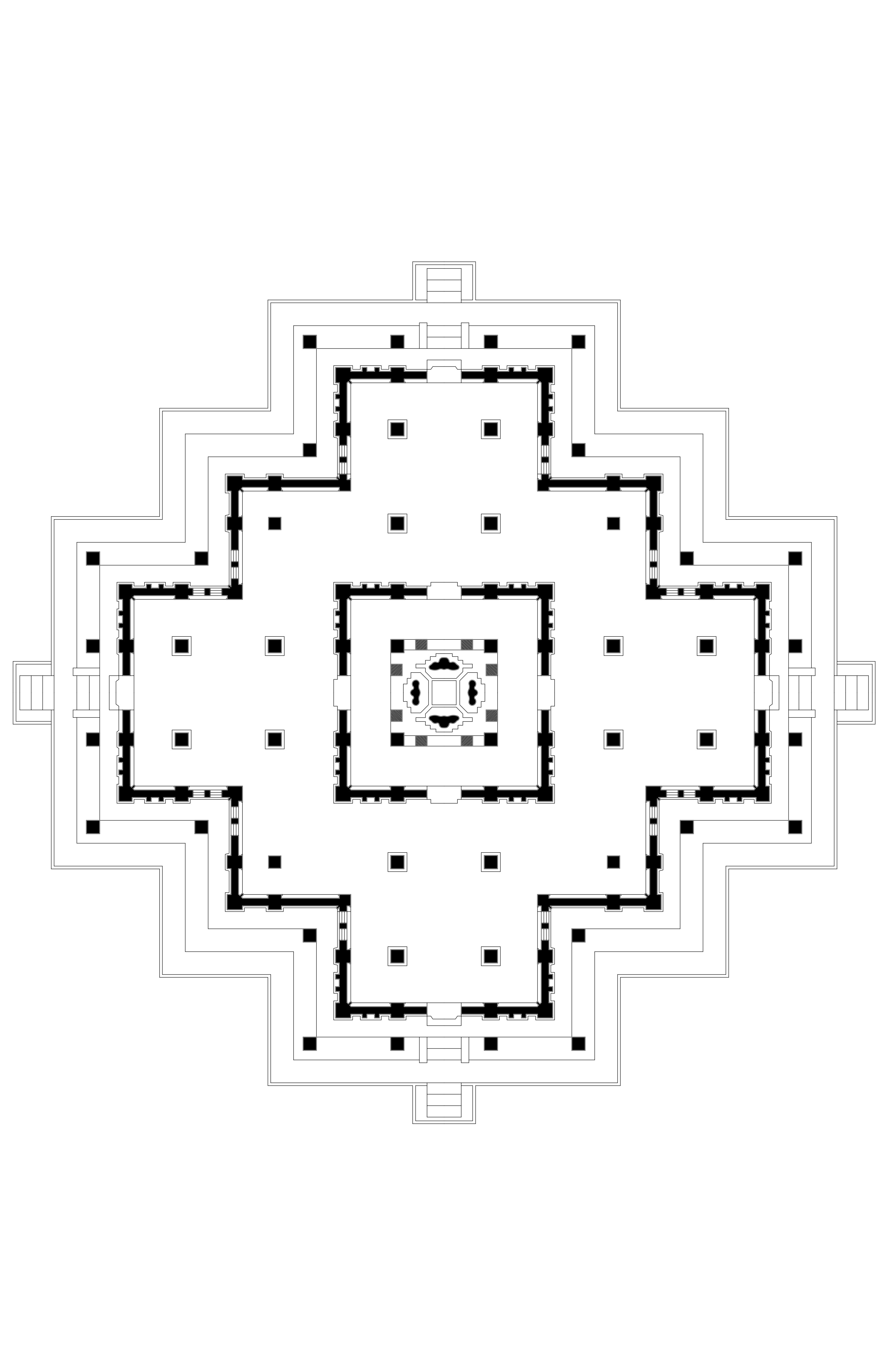
Floor plan of the temple

Chaturmukha Basadi is a famous Jain center located in the Gerusoppa. The temple is cross-shaped chaturmukha (transl. four-faced) structure built in the Western Chalukya architecture. The temple is built principally of grey granite and is organised around a central four-faced sanctuary approached from four directions. Its symmetrical plan gives the monument its name, Chaturmukha Basadi. The temple contains a central shrine, which has four entrances, and enshrines a life-size chaturmukha idol of Jina, Rishabhanatha, Ajitanatha, Sambhavanatha and Abhinandananatha, facing the four cardinal directions. Each hall of the temple is supported by four pillars with square bases and overhanging brackets with carvings of lotuses. There are ornate idols of Dvarapala, wearing a high crown and each holding a club and a cobra, on either side of the temple entrance.

The pillars and brackets are comparatively restrained in decoration, while lotus motifs provide much of the carved architectural ornament. The use of massive granite members contributes to the monumental character of the otherwise relatively compact structure. There are idols of Tirthankara in the lotus position on three doorways and an image of Gajalakshmi on the fourth. The presence of Gajalakshmi alongside Jain imagery illustrates the incorporation of motifs shared with the wider artistic traditions of medieval Karnataka. There is a shrine to of Jwalamalini inside the temple. The temple also enshrines images of Virabhadra and Ganesha.

Chaturmukha Basadi forms part of a wider group of surviving Jain monuments at Gerusoppa. Nineteenth-century archaeological surveys recorded several basadis, images and inscriptions scattered among the ruins of the former settlement.

== Other Jain Temples in Gerusoppa ==
There are four other Jain temples in Gerusoppa.

1. Mahavira temple houses a black stone idol of Mahavira, the 24th Tirthankara. The temple preserves several inscribed stone slabs, making it particularly important for reconstructing the history of the Jain settlement at Gerusoppa. The temple also houses three stone slab inscriptions — (1) 1.9 by 0.74 metres (6 ft 3 in × 2 ft 5 in) slab inscription, dated 1378 CE, with Jina at top with two worshippers, a cow and a calf. (2) 1.42 by 0.67 metres (4 ft 8 in × 2 ft 2 in) slab inscription has three sections; the first line has an image of Jina with an attendant, the second line has two male worshippers in the lotus position and third has two female worshippers on either side. (3) 1.57 by 0.66 metres (5 ft 2 in × 2 ft 2 in) slab inscription with a Jina inside temple adorned by devotees.
2. Neminatha temple, situated near Mahavira temple, enshrines a large idol of Neminatha, the 22nd Tirthankara, seated on a circular pedestal.
3. Parshvanatha temple enshrines many idols collected from nearby shrines including a Pañcadhātu idol of Parshvanatha. There are images of twelve Tirthankaras in the panel of the temple.
4. Kade temple enshrines a carved idol 1.32 metres (4 ft 4 in) of Parshvanatha with the hood of a cobra. Together with Chaturmukha Basadi, these monuments constitute the principal surviving remains of the medieval Jain centre at Gerusoppa.

== See also ==
- Mirjan Fort
- Hadavalli
- Karkala
- Gerusoppa
