= Mirjan Fort =

Fort built by Rani Chennabhairadevi

- Part of Uttara Kannada
- Karnataka, India
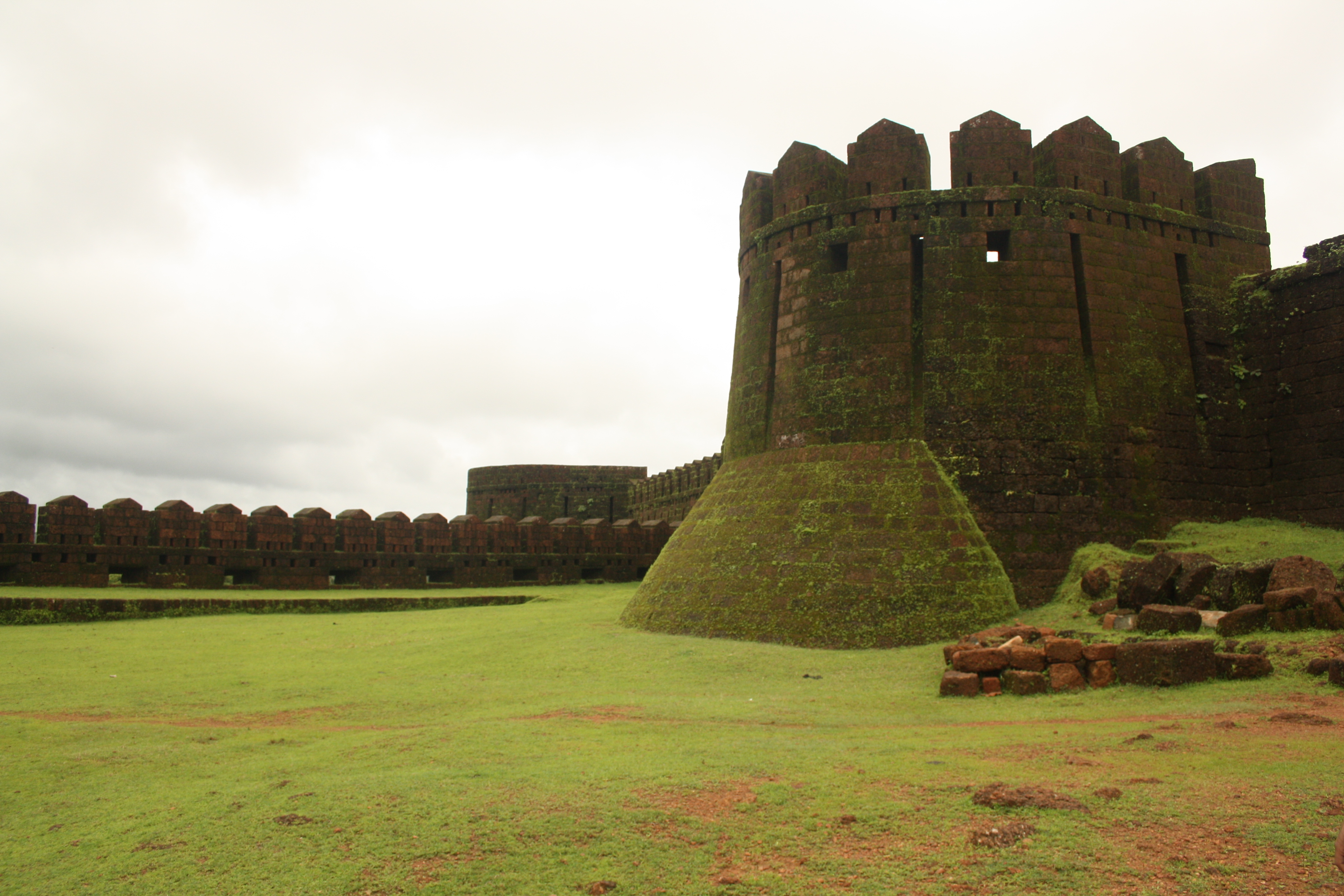

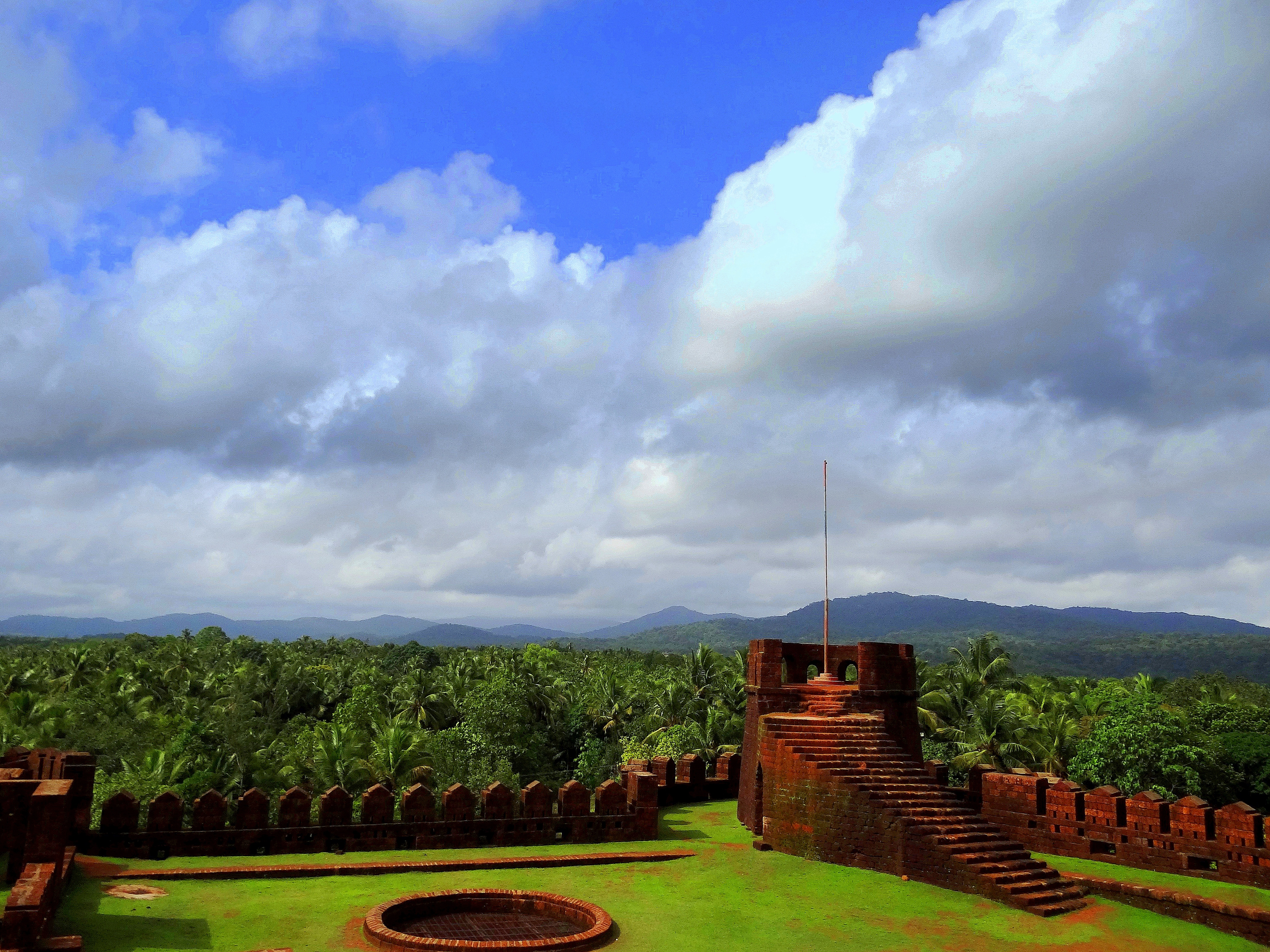

Site information
- Type: Fusion of Deccan and Mughal Architecture
- Controlled by: Government of Karnataka
- Open to the public: Yes
- Condition: Ruins

Location
- Mirjan Fort
- Location within Karnataka
- Coordinates: 14.4888°N 74.4175°E

Site history
- Built: Built in 16th century by Rani Chennabhairadevi and refurbished in 17th century
- Materials: Laterite Stones and mud

The Mirjan Fort is located on the west coast of the Uttara Kannada district in the southern Indian state of Karnataka. The fort known for its architectural elegance has been the location of several battles in the past. It is about 0.5 kilometres (0.31 mi) from the National Highway 66 and 21 kilometres (13 mi) from Gokarna, the famous Hindu pilgrimage centre on the west coast of India.

According to the first historical version, Rani Chennabhairadevi of Gersoppa (under the Vijayanagara Empire) was initially credited with building the Mirjan Fort in the 16th century. She ruled for 54 years and also lived in the fort. During her reign, the port at Mirjan, which is 32 kilometres (20 mi) to the southeast of Karwar, was used for shipping pepper, saltpetre and betel nut to Surat. Gersoppa, a district annexed to Bednur, was famous for the pepper exported from this region. Consequently, the Portuguese gave Chennabhairadevi the epithet "Rani, the Pepper queen" ("Rainha de Pimenta" in Portuguese).

== History ==
There are many versions to the dating of this fort. The first historical version the Mirjan Fort was built initially by a Nawayath asper Ibn_Battuta book this fort was first built by Nawayath Sultanates early 1200, then it came under the Vijayanagara Empire. Then the fort was refurbished in 1608 (Archaeological Survey of India (ASI) refers to its building over a period of 1608–1640) on the south east coastal part of the Tadri Creek.

Another version that is traced to the period 1552–1606 is that the Mirjan Fort was built initially by Queen Chennabhairadevi. She was from the Tuluva-Saluva clan and ruled for a long period (for 54 years) under the protection of the Vijayanagara Empire (the queen preferred to be subordinate (mahamandaleshwara) of Vijayanagar rulers), as the queen of Gersoppa (a small town on the northern banks of the Sharavati River). She was given the epithet "the Pepper Queen or Raina da Pimenta'. She devoutly practiced Jainism and during her rule constructed many Jain basadis. She ruled "in conformity with the doctrine of succession Aliyasantana or Matriarchal, a tradition followed in coastal belt of Konkan and Kerala". Her domain covered North and South Kanara districts and south Goa, which had important ports such as Malpe, Bidnoor, Mirjan, Honnavar, Ankola and Karwar from where the pepper, the most important produce of the region, was shipped to Europe. However, she suffered reverses after the Talikota war in which the Vijayanagar Empire was routed. She then shifted from Mirjan Fort to a safe location in an island in the middle of the Sharavathi River.

According to another version, a Bijapur noble Sherif-ul Mulk built this fort as a first line of defence to protect Kumta town and the Kumta fort located to its south. The fort was built or refurbished in 1608 (Archaeological Survey of India (ASI) refers to its building over a period of 1608–1640) on the south east coastal part of the Tadri Creek.

One more version is that the fort was under the rulers of the Vijayanagara Empire. After the fall of this empire, Bijapur sultans are stated to have captured the fort and Sharief-ul-mulk, the then governor of Goa, is credited to have either built or refurbished the fort. Mirjan was the location of their palace. In the 17th century, the Keladi dynasty, an independent principality then ruled the territory of Kanara, south of Mirjan with their capital at Bednur. In 1676, Keladi queen Chennamma had captured this territory up to Mirjan.

In 1757, the Marathas had seized the Mirjan Fort. The event that led to the capture of the fort was due to the death of Basappa Naik, the last ruler of Bednur, in 1755. His wife had taken control, representing her 17-year-old adopted son, Chanbasaviah. Since her adopted son opposed her taking a "paramour", she got him murdered. This had resulted in a revolt by the agitated local people, and taking advantage of the situation the Marathas had captured the fort.

In the period between May 1783 and March 1784, the British, under the command of Major Torriano had captured the fort before proceeding to Honnavar.

Chroniclers of History like De Barros, Barbosa, Hamilton and Buchanan have recorded the history of the fort under the rule of Vijayanagara kings, under the name of Mergan. In 1720, Hamilton refers to its importance as a minor port that was used for export of pepper, cassia, saltpetre, and wild nutmeg. In 1801, Buchanan called the place a "Midijoy".

== Geography ==
The fort is located on the banks of the Aganashini River. The mouth of the river is 12 kilometres (7.5 mi) from the Mirjan village. It is in a creek on a bend of the river, known as the Tadri Creek. The fort is approached through a series of wide steps that lead to the interior of the fort. Its location in Kumta taluk is 8 kilometres (5.0 mi) to the north of the Kumta town.

The fort is located in the precincts of the Mirjan village (area 653.92 hectares (1,615.9 acres)), which is bounded between (14.4687°N 74.4191°E) and (14.5052°N 74.4446°E), near Kumta. The reported climatic conditions of the village reflect the conditions in the fort precincts as well. The area experiences a high humid climate all through the year. The recorded mean annual rainfall of 3,521.7 millimetres (138.65 in) is very high. The maximum temperature reported is 32.4 °C (90.3 °F) in May and the minimum temperature recorded is 20.9 °C (69.6 °F) during January. Laterite topography dominates the region. Further, Mirjan has also been identified by "Forbes, 1783 (or. Mem. IV. 109), and by Renel, 1788 (Map of Hindustan", as Muziris of Ptolemy (150 A.D.) and Periplus (247 A.D.), then an important trading port on the west coast of India.

Mirjan, however, was spelt differently by the Portuguese chroniclers and in the maps of the 16th century, and the river flowing nearby was also then called the Ganghwali River; Barbosa spelt it as Mjrgeu, in Renel's map of c.1517 it is spelt as Mergueo and in c.1518 and subsequent maps spelt as Mergeo.

== Structure ==
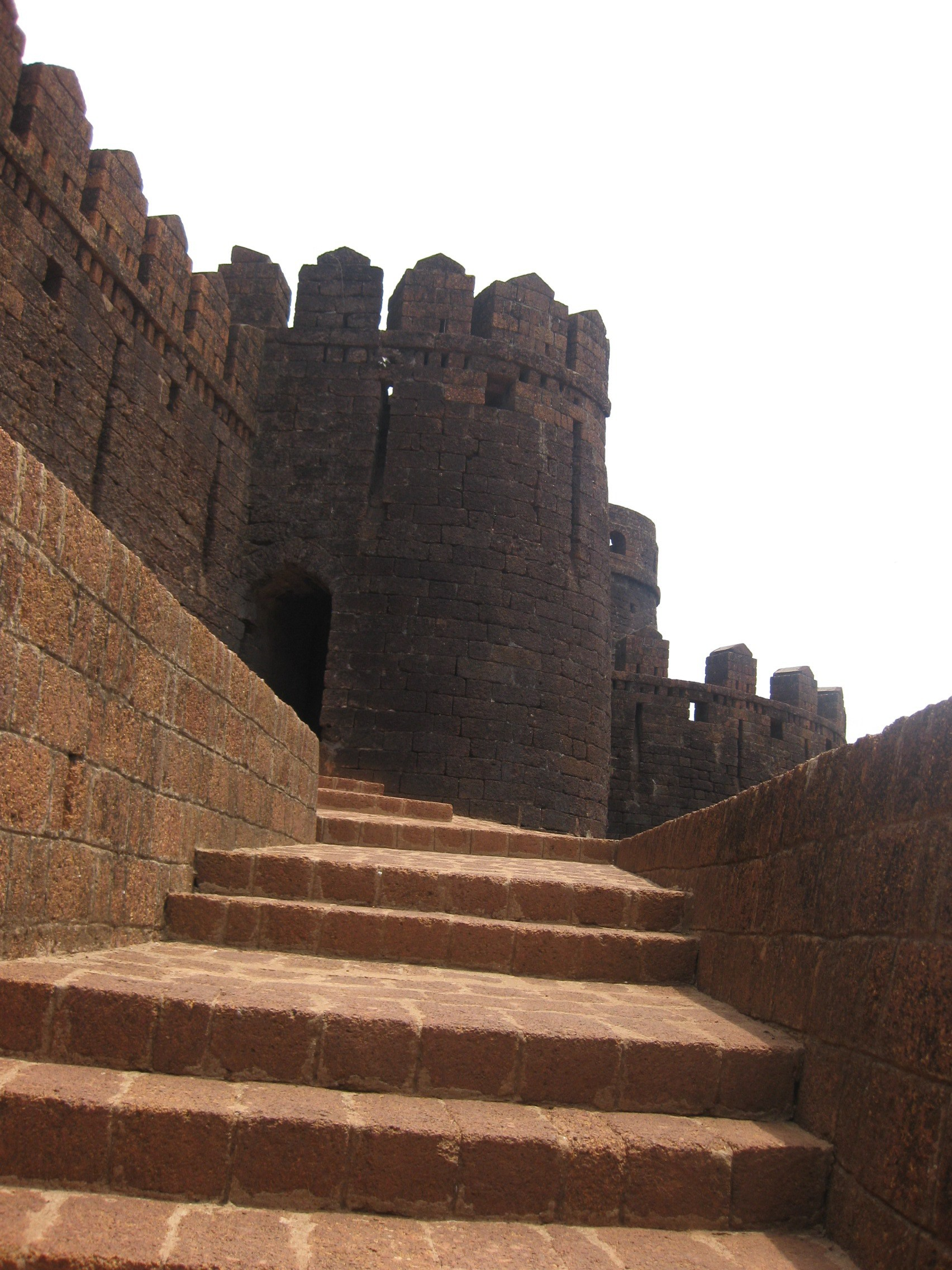
Main entrance to the Mirjan Fort with wide steps

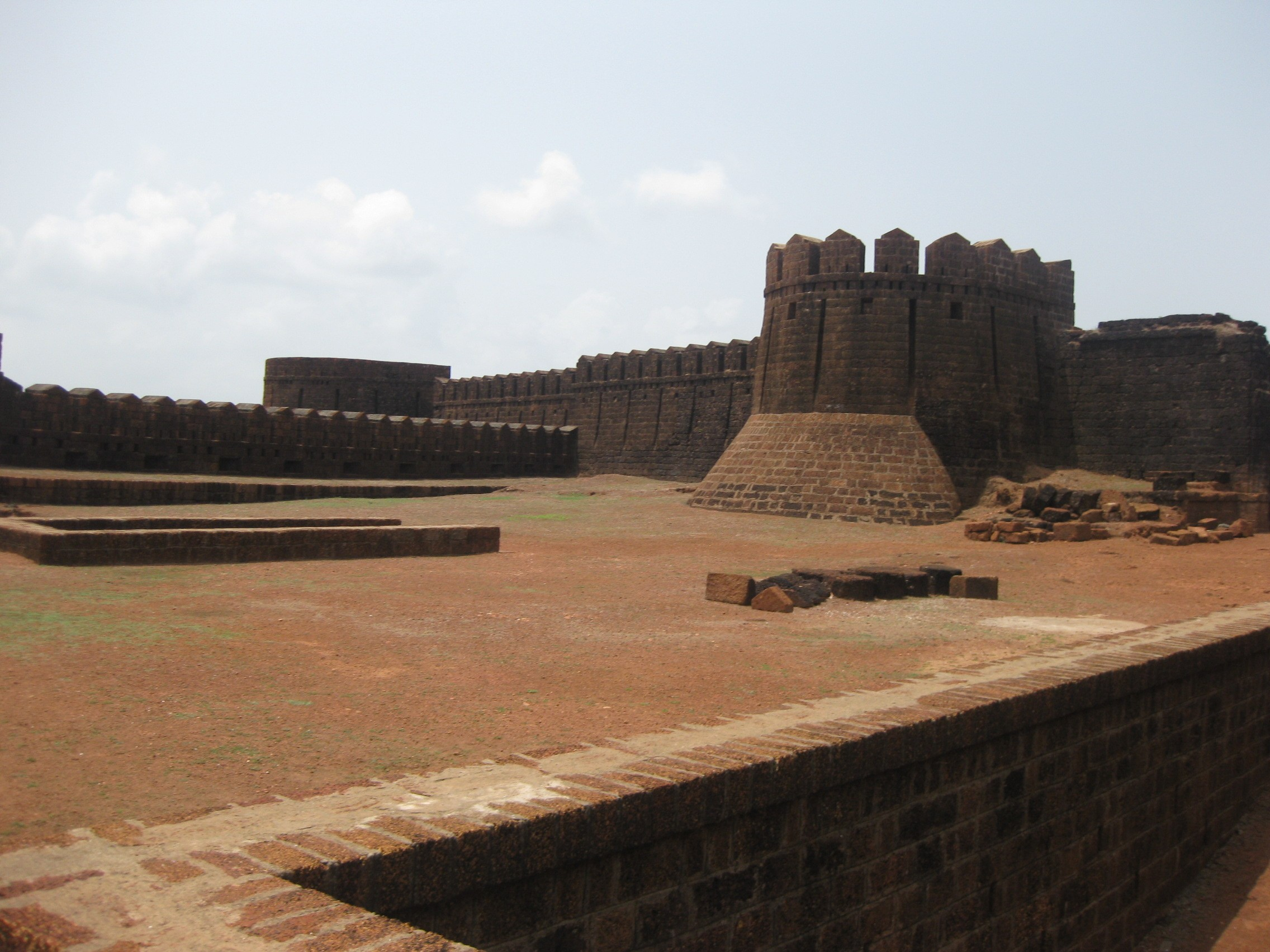
View of southern ramparts from inside the Mirjan Fort

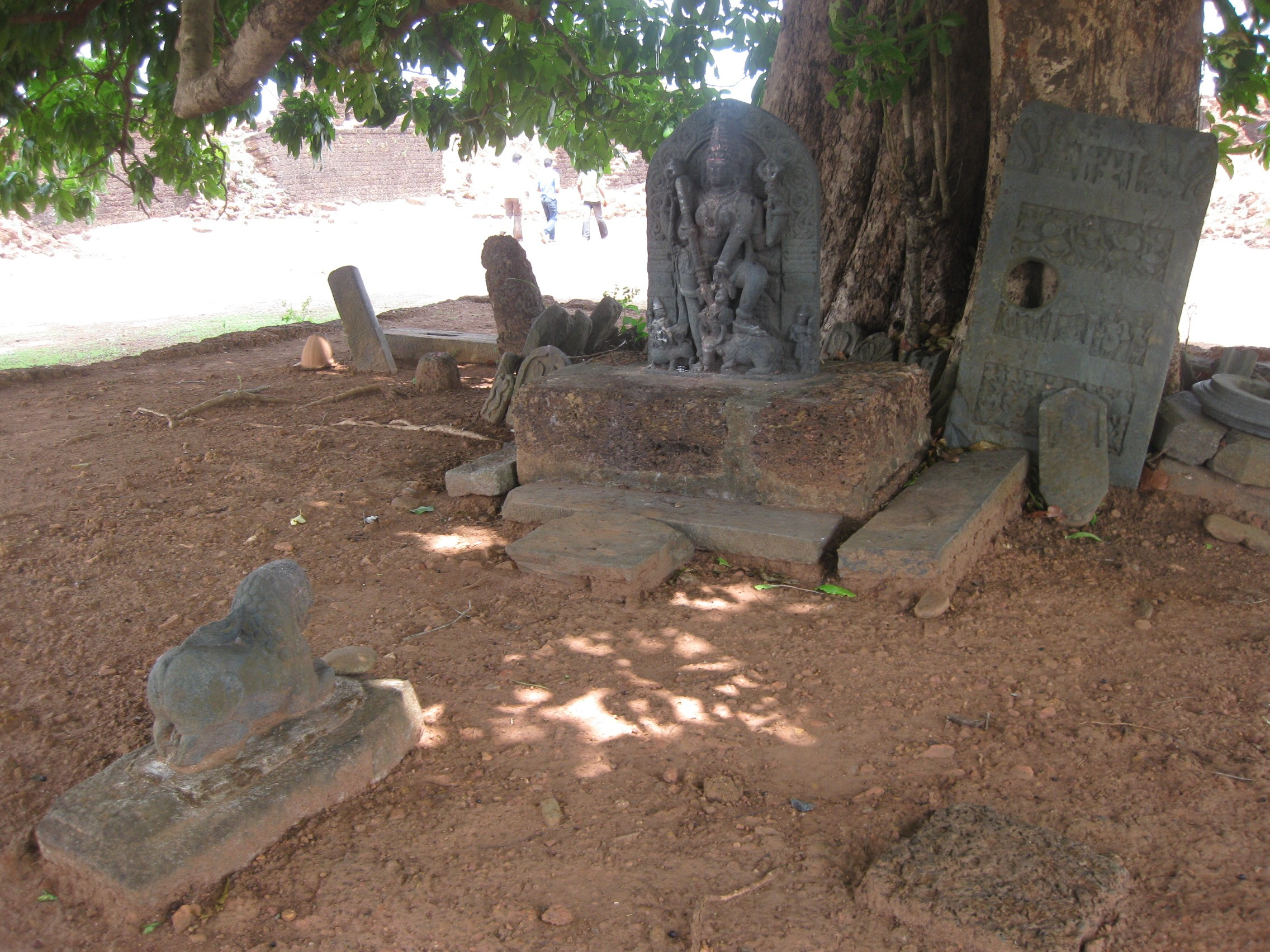
Images of Hindu Goddess Mahishasuramardini and other deities under a tree

The fort is built over an area of about 4.1 hectares (10 acres). It is built with laterite stones. It was built with high walls and bastions. The fort has four entrances (one main and three subsidiary entrances) and many wells, which are interlinked and with access channels leading to the circular moat (used as a defence measure to protect the fort) that once fully surrounded the fort, and leading to the canal works outside the fort's limits. At each entrance, there are wide steps to enter the fort. The fort is double-walled and has high turrets on the bastions. It is now seen mostly in ruins but is being restored by ASI to some extent. The ruins have been inferred as remnants of a secret passage, entry doors, a darbar hall and a market place. Stone images of Hindu gods and goddesses are also seen under a large tree.

Restoration works

The fort was maintained by the British with grant funds till India got independence in August 1947. Thereafter, ASI has taken over its maintenance. Refurbishing of the ruins of the northern bastion fortification of the fort has been done with stones found in the area. The wild forest growth inside the fort and on the fort walls has been cleared. In the restoration works carried out during 2000–2001, initially, the debris that had accumulated due to collapse of the bastions was removed. The damaged portions of the fort walls were redone with dressed laterite stones. A waterproof coating was provided to the excavated structures, along with pointing of the joints with "combination mortor".

== Archaeological excavations ==
During the year 2000–01, ASI carried out excavations in the precincts of the fort. These excavations have unearthed laterite structures of medieval period in the form of: a U-shaped structure with a "cloister all around" with a circular soakage pit adjoining it; and a water tank connected with channels. Antiquarian findings also included a gold coin minted in 1652 with inscriptions that attribute it to the Portuguese Viceroy Conde De Sarzedas during the reign of Joao IV, cannonballs, Chinese Porcelain, clay tablets with Islamic inscriptions. Further details provided by an official of the ASI indicate that "seven dumb-bells, 50 iron bullets, coins and designed earth pots belonging to Sarpamallika dynasty" were also found during the excavations at the fort.

== Gallery ==
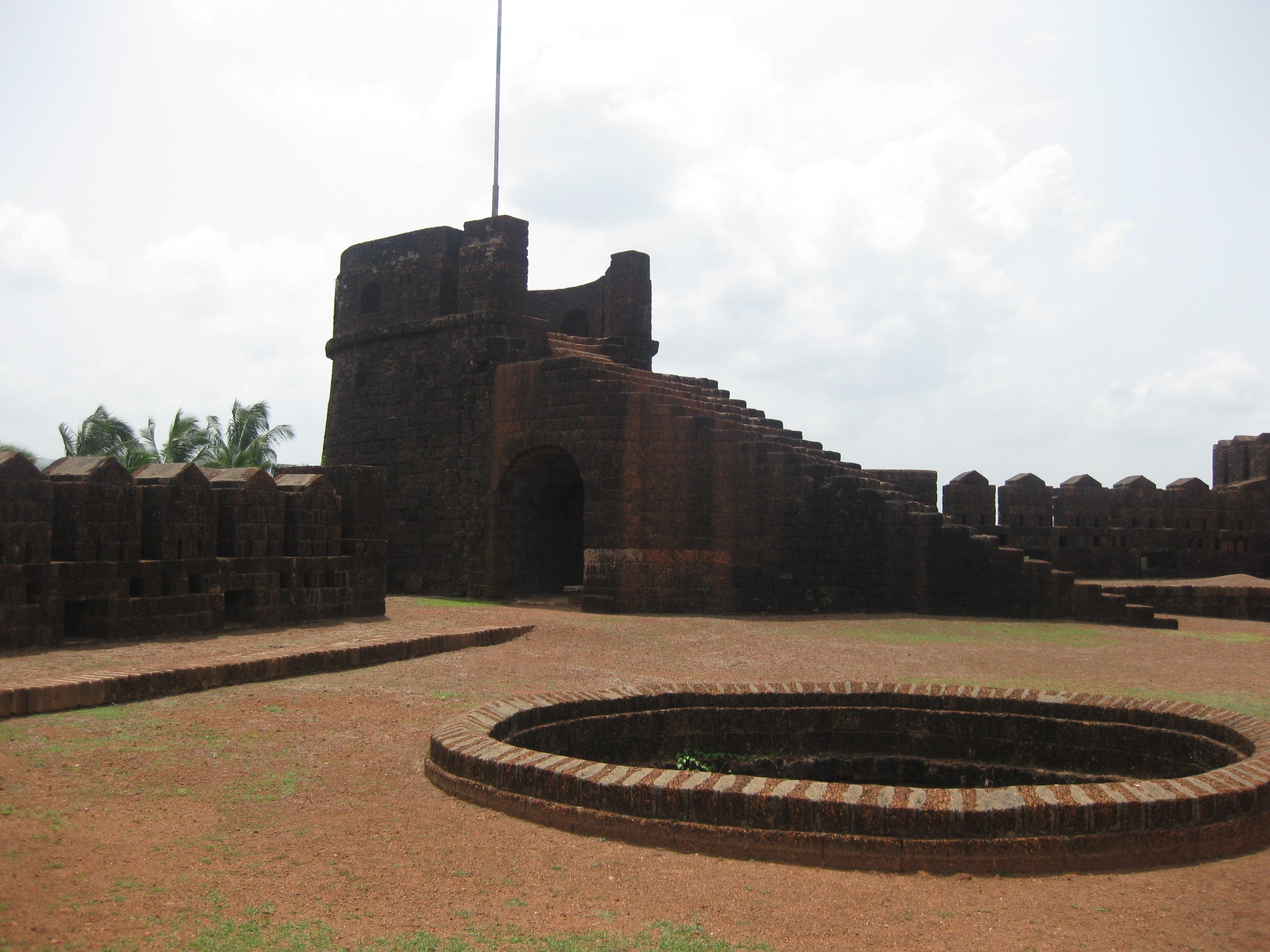
Watch tower cum flag hoisting tower of Mirjan Fort

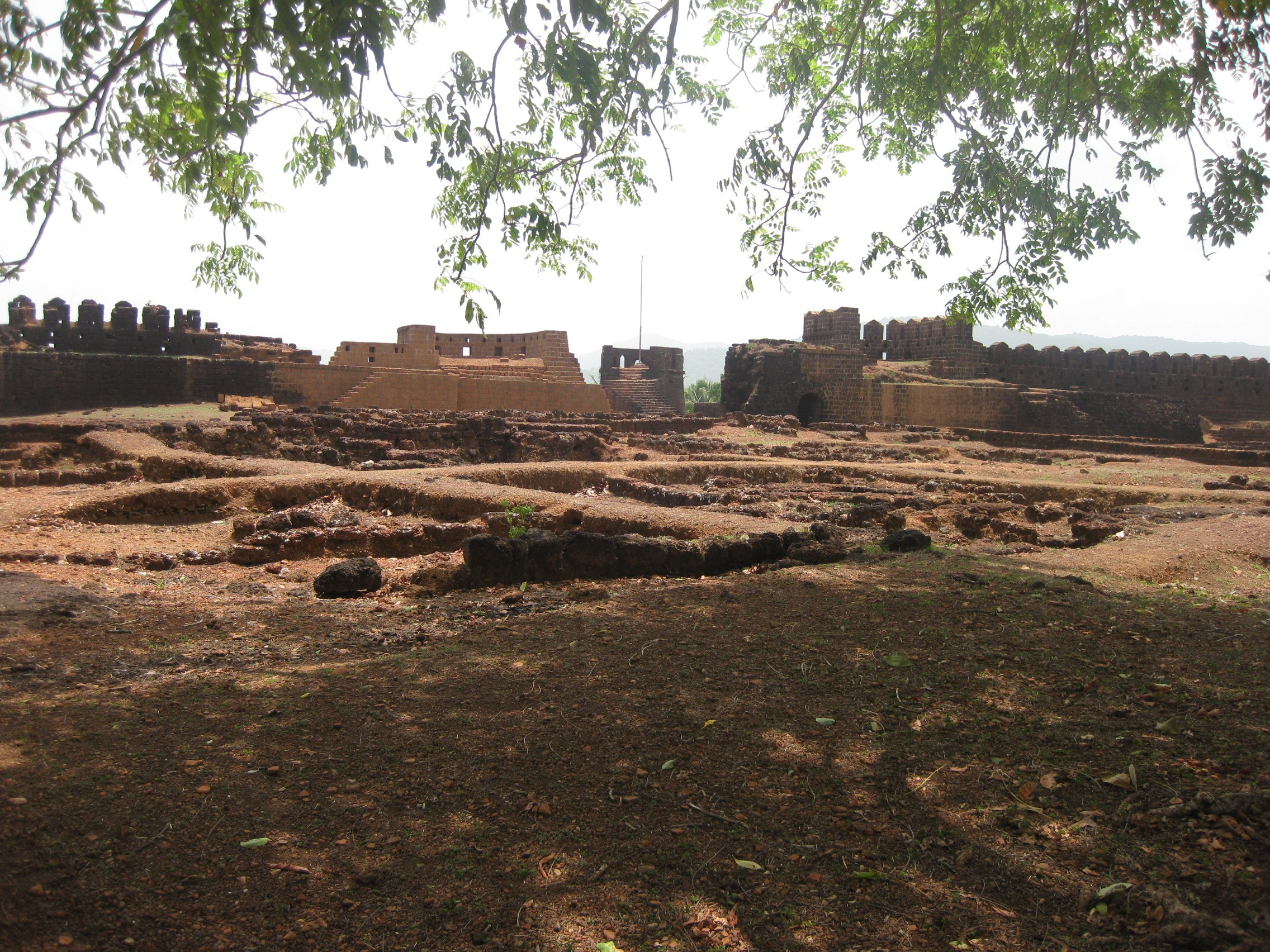
West view of Mirjan Fort from inside the fort

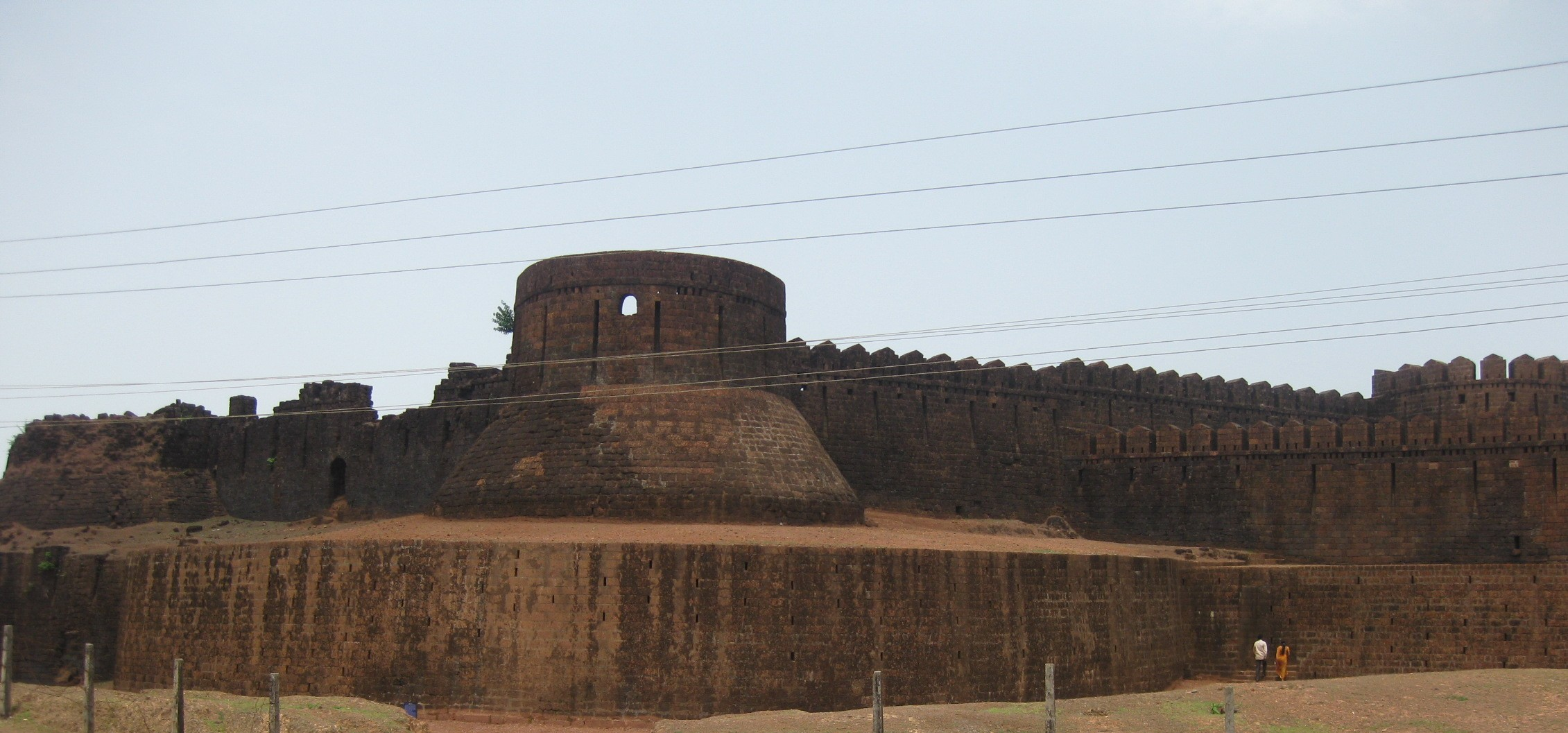
The Mirjan fort bastion and watch tower

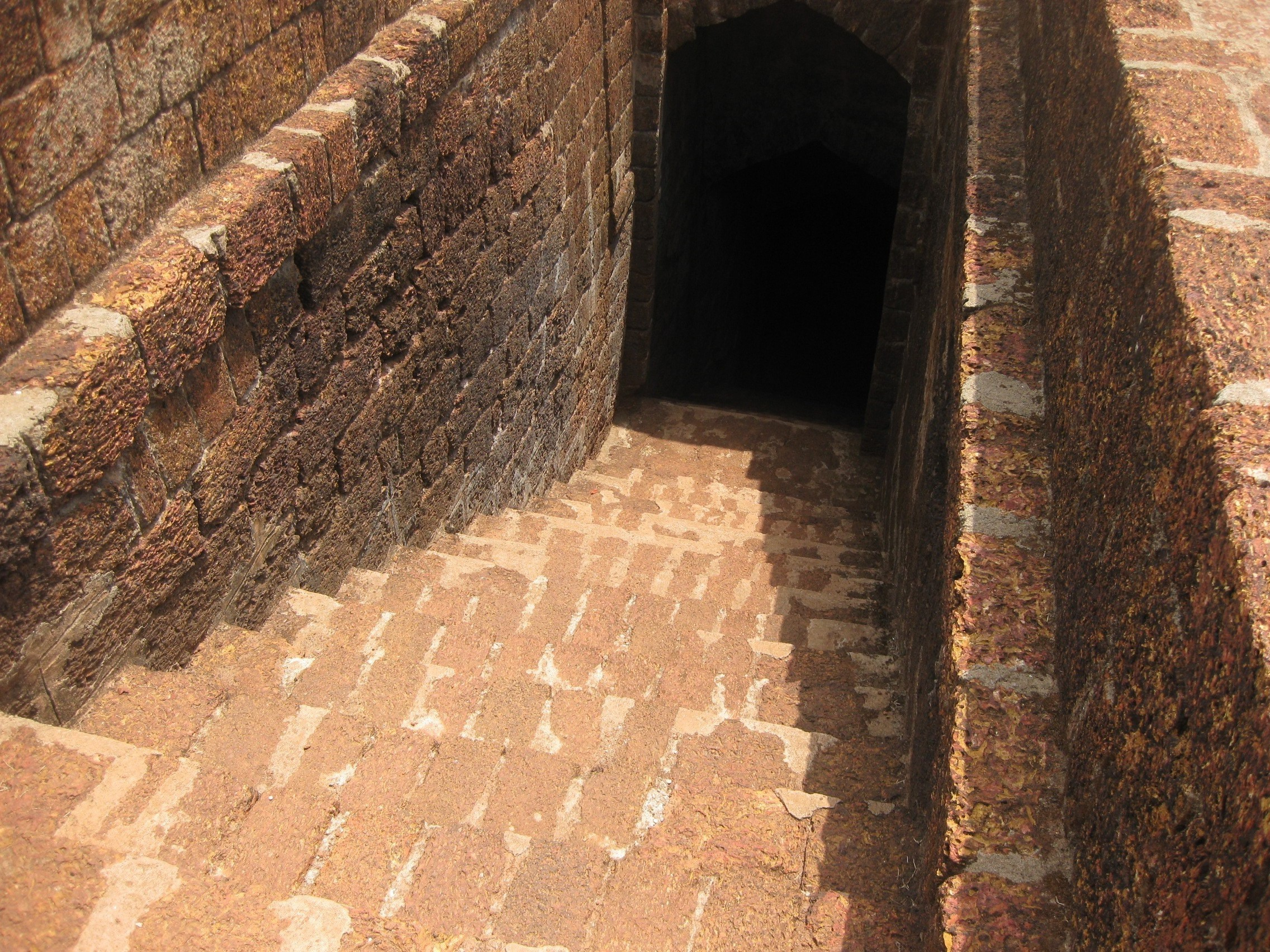
Steps to a well in the Mirjan Fort

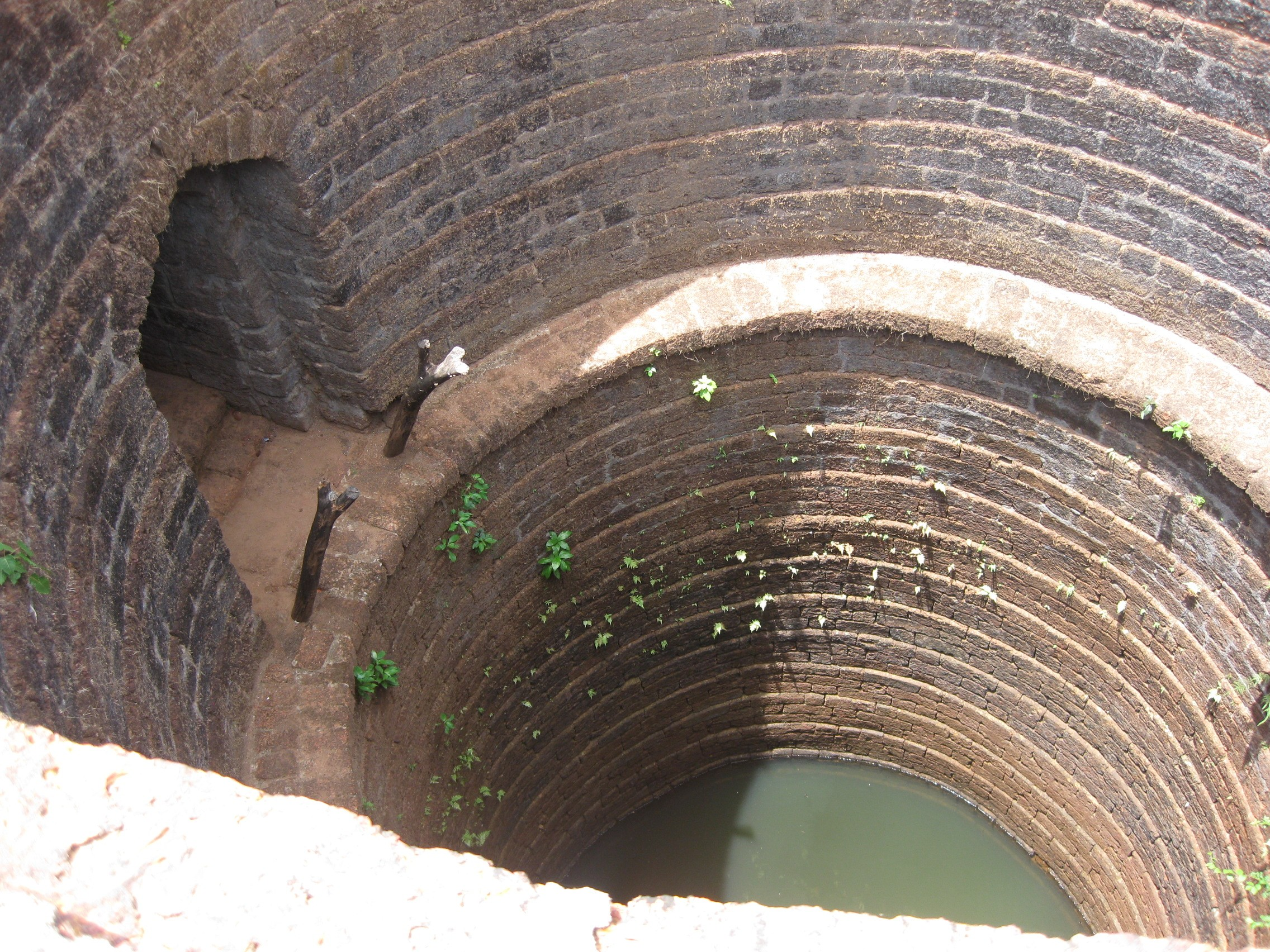
A deep well in Mirjan fort

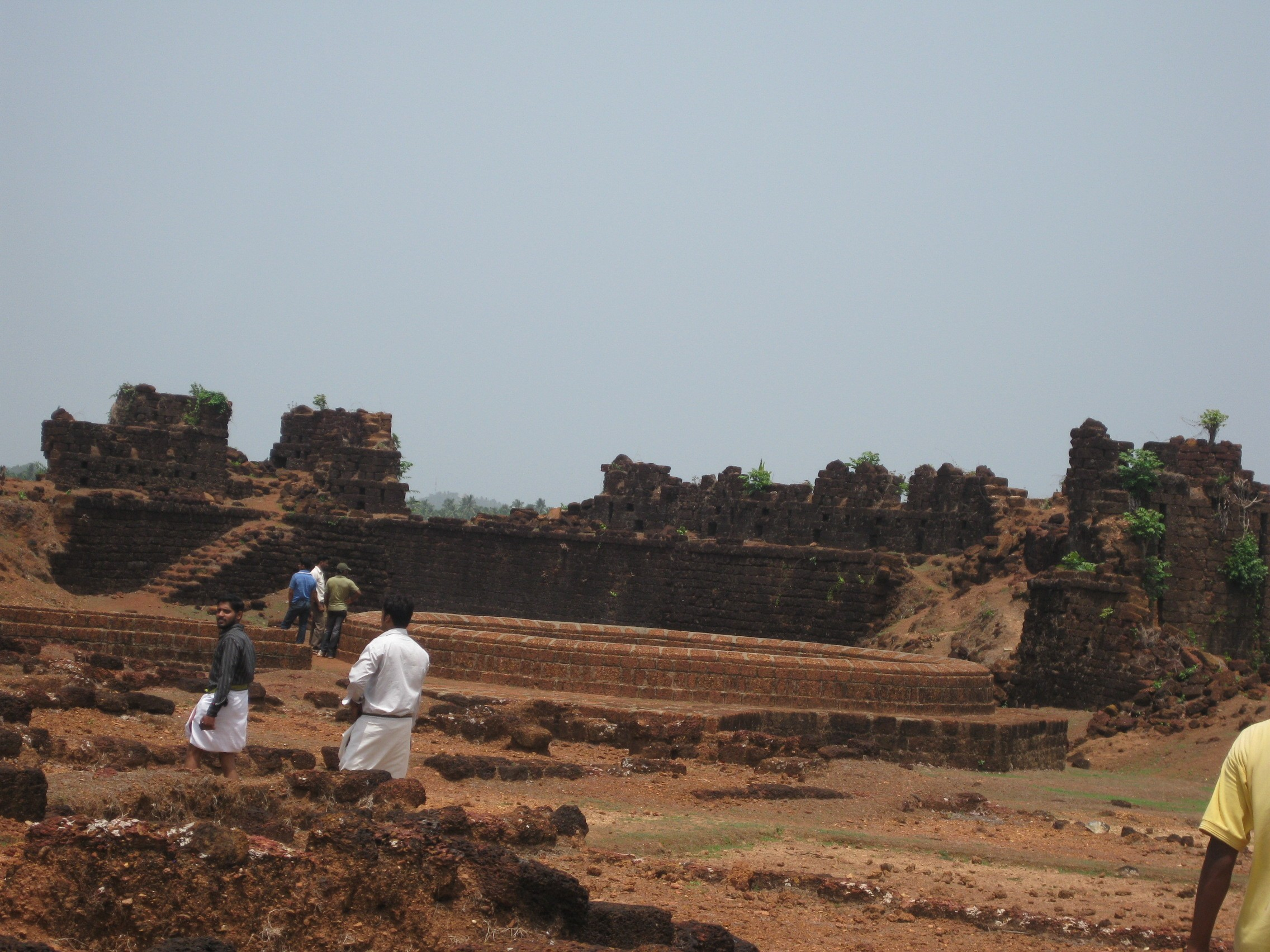
A well and some ruins inside the Mirjan fort

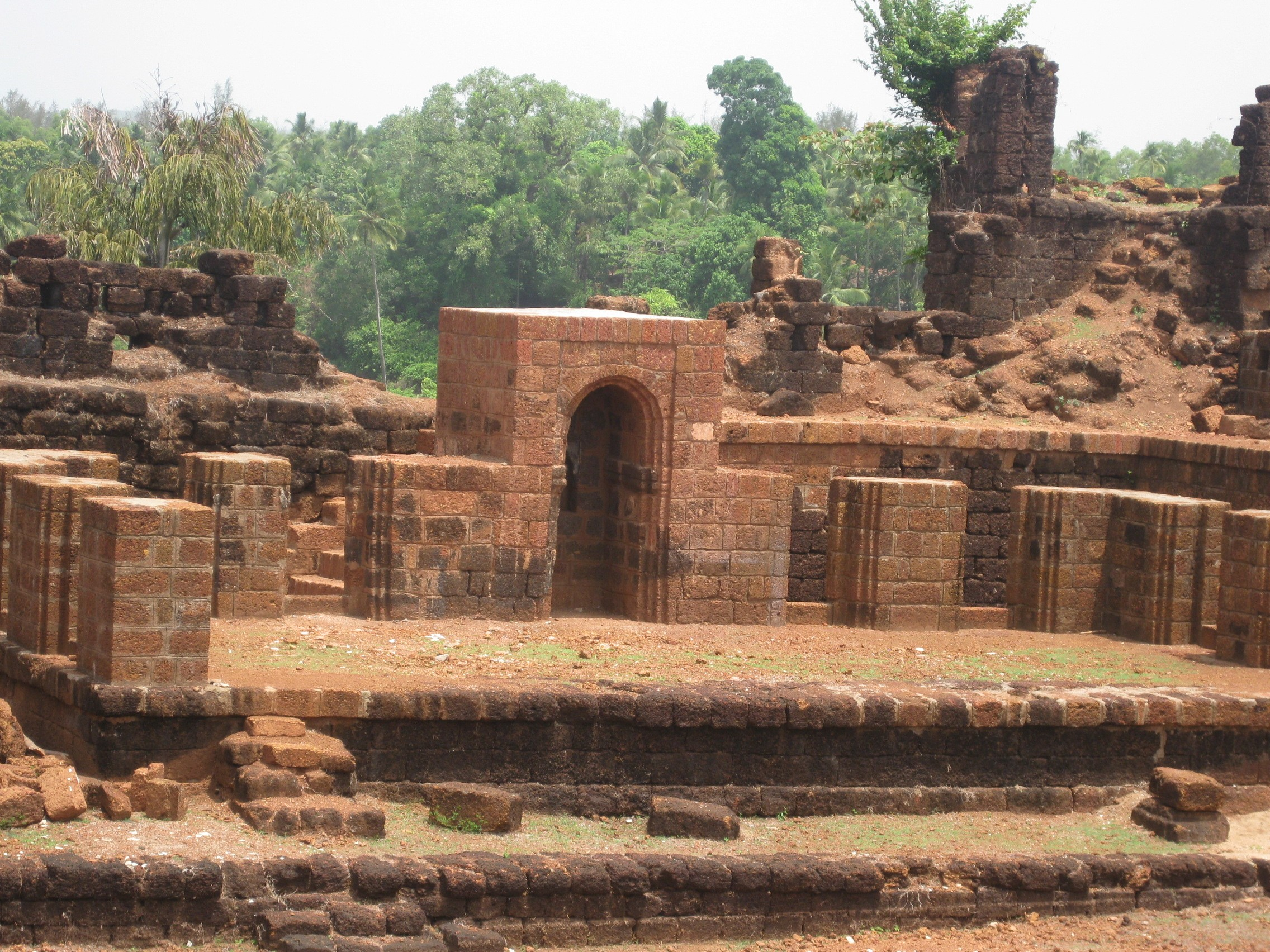
Prayer hall and the Mihrab at the Mirjan fort

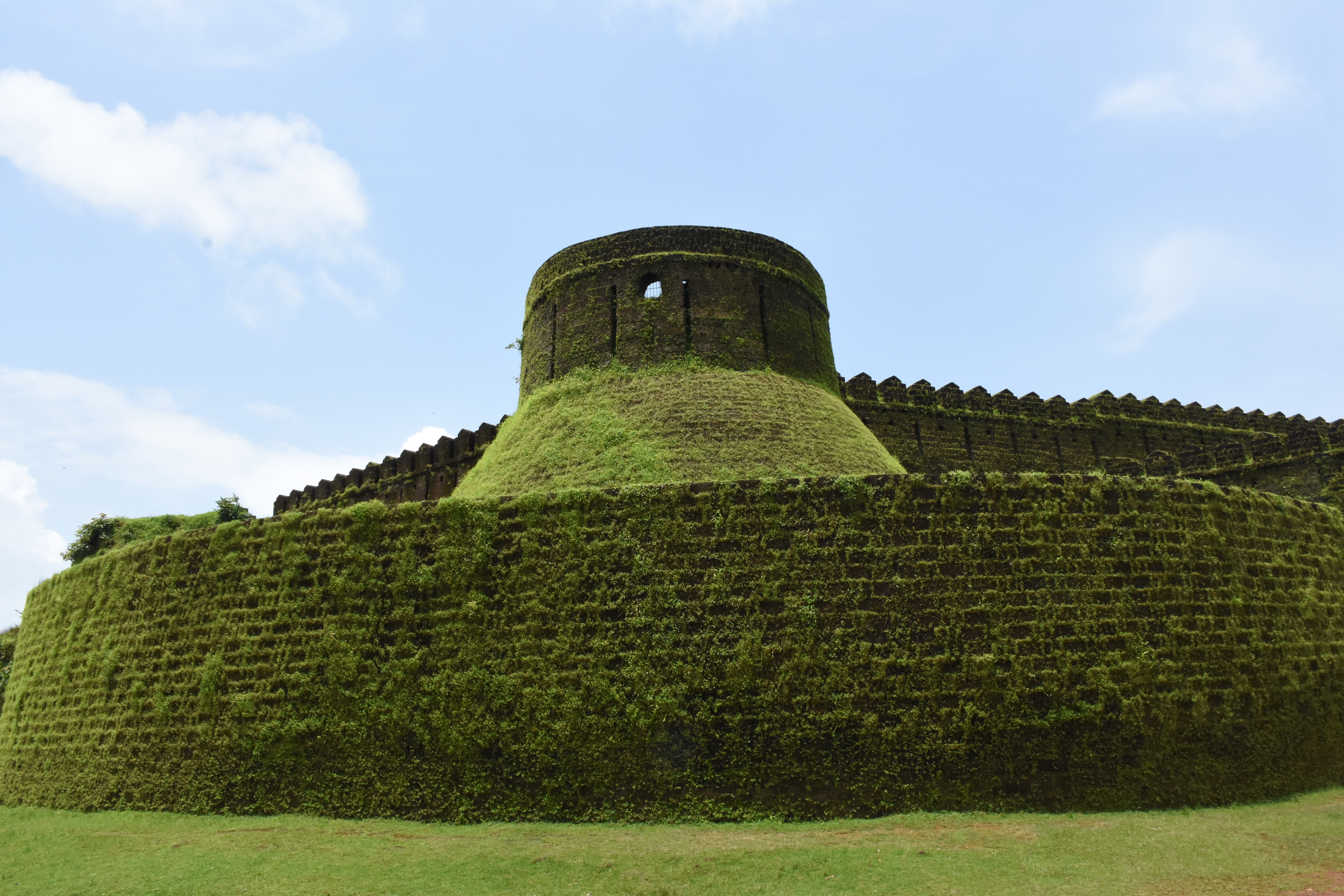
Mirjan Fort in rainy season

== See also ==
- Chaturmukha Basadi, Gerusoppa
