= Navilgone =

- village
- Location in Karnataka, India Navilgone (India)
- Coordinates: 14°36′34″N 74°45′15″E
- Country: India
- State: Karnataka

Government
  - Type: Panchayati raj (India)
  - Body: Gram panchayat

Population
  - Total: 3,000

Languages
  - Official: Kannada
- Time zone: UTC+5:30 (IST)
- Postal code: 581338
- ISO 3166 code: IN-KA
- Vehicle registration: KA
- Website: karnataka.gov.in

Navilgone is a village in Honavar taluk, India. Several famous Indians are natives of Navilgone. It's also the land of many Kalavidas(artists).The village is home to approximately 300 families. The main way of life is agriculture. Major crops are arecanut, coconut, paddy and cashew nuts.
