= Adkar =

- village
- Interactive map of Adkar
- Coordinates: 14.2423°N 74.5528°E
- Country: India
- State: Karnataka
- District: Uttara Kannada
- Talukas: Honavar

Government
  - Body: Village Panchayat

Languages
  - Official: Kannada
- Time zone: UTC+5:30 (IST)
- Nearest cities: Mangalore, Karwar
- Civic agency: Village Panchayat

Adkar is a village in the southern state of Karnataka, India. It is located in the Honavar taluk of Uttara Kannada district in Karnataka.

== See also ==
- Uttara Kannada
- Mangalore
- Districts of Karnataka
