= Adekekuli =

- village
- Interactive map of Adekekuli
- Coordinates: 14.159°N 74.562°E
- Country: India
- State: Karnataka
- District: Uttara Kannada
- Talukas: Honavar

Government
  - Body: Village Panchayat

Languages
  - Official: Kannada
- Time zone: UTC+5:30 (IST)
- Nearest city: Uttara Kannada
- Civic agency: Village Panchayat

Adekekuli is a village in the southern state of Karnataka, India. It is located in the Honavar taluk of Uttara Kannada district.

== See also ==
- Uttara Kannada
- Districts of Karnataka
