= Krishnavarma II =

- Dharmamahārājadhirāja

King of the Kadamba Kingdom
- Reign: c. 516 - 540 CE
- Predecessor: Simhavarma
- Successor: Ajavarma
- House: Kadamba

Krishnavarma II (r. 516–540) was a Kadamba king.

== Life ==
Krishnavarma II was born to Simhavarma. He conquered Harivarma with help of Western Ganga dynasty. His sister was married to Madhava II. His son and successor was Ajavarma. He was requested by Haridatta Sreshthin for donation of village Kalanallura to a brahmin.
