= Ajavarma =

- Dharmamahārājadhirāja

King of the Kadamba Kingdom
- Reign: c. 565 - 606 CE
- Predecessor: Krishnavarma II
- Successor: Bhogivarma
- House: Kadamba

Ajavarma (r. 565–606) was a Kadamba king.

== Life ==
He was born to Krishnavarma II. He was defeated by Kirttivarman I of Chalukya dynasty. His son and successor was Bhogivarma.
