= Shivamandhatruvarma =

- Dharmamahārājadhirāja

King of the Kadamba Kingdom
- Reign: c. 460 - 475 CE
- Predecessor: Santivarma
- Successor: Mrigeshavarma
- House: Kadamba

Shivamandhatruvarma (r. 460–475) was a Kadamba king.
