= Rani Chennabhairadevi =

Longest ruling queen in Indian history

Chennabhairadevi
- Mahamandaleshwari; Queen of pepper; Avvarasi
- Bronze statue of Chennabhairadevi
- Born: 16 C. Bhatkal
- Died: Early 17th century Keladi
- Religion: Jainism
- Known for: Longest ruled queen (54 years); War against Portuguese in 1570
- Family: Saluva dynasty

Rani Chennabhairadevi, (also called Raina-Da-Pimenta lit. 'The Queen of Pepper' by the Portuguese), was a 16th-century Vijayanagara Empire Jain queen of Nagire province. She was officially known as Mahamandaleshwari Rani Chennabhairadevi. She is regarded as being the longest ruling queen in Indian history, from 1552 to 1606, a period of 54 years. She is also known for her wars against the Portuguese in 1559 and 1570, which she won and helped start commercial relationships with the Portuguese.

She earned the title "The Queen of Pepper" from the Portuguese ("Rainha de Pimenta" in Portuguese), as she exported a great amount of pepper and other spices to European and Arab regions through the ports of Bhatkal and Honnavar.

== Nagire province ==
Nagire province, also known as the province of Gerusoppa, was one of the small provinces under the control of the king of Vijayanagara, known as Mahamandala. The province followed the banks of Sharavathi river and extended from South Goa to Malabar. Gerusoppa served as the capital of the province. The province was rich in spices and had important ports on the west coast, such as Bhatkal, Honnavar and Karwar. Jog Falls, India's second highest plunge waterfall is located near Gerusoppa. In fact locals call Jog Falls 'Gerusoppa Falls' after the province.

The provinces of Bilgi and Keladi were Nagire's neighbours and often tried to conquer Nagire to extend their kingdoms. To counter them, Chennabhairadevi developed a good relationship with the Bijapur kings.

== History ==
The kings of one branch of the Saluva Dynasty of Vijayanagar ruled Gerusoppa while another dynasty ruled Haduvalli (Bhatkala). King Immadi Devaraya (1515–50) of Haduvalli, fought against the Portuguese. After his defeat in a fierce battle near MadaGoa in 1542, the Portuguese burnt down his capital Bhatkala. His wife Chennadevi was the elder sister of Chennabhairadevi.

The Portuguese captain Alfonso D'Souza attacked Bhatkala, defeated Chennadevi and burnt Bhatkala, accusing her of sheltering non-cartaged Mohammedan ships in the port and for not paying Kappa (tax) as per the agreement with the Portuguese. After her elder sister, Chennabhairadevi got the power of Gerusoppe along with Haduvalli.

== Reign of the Queen ==
Mahamandaleshwari Chennabhairadevi was praised by historians for being a good administrator. She reigned from 1552 to 1606.

Bhairadevi built Mirjan Fort on the banks of the Aghanashini river, using it to control the pepper business.

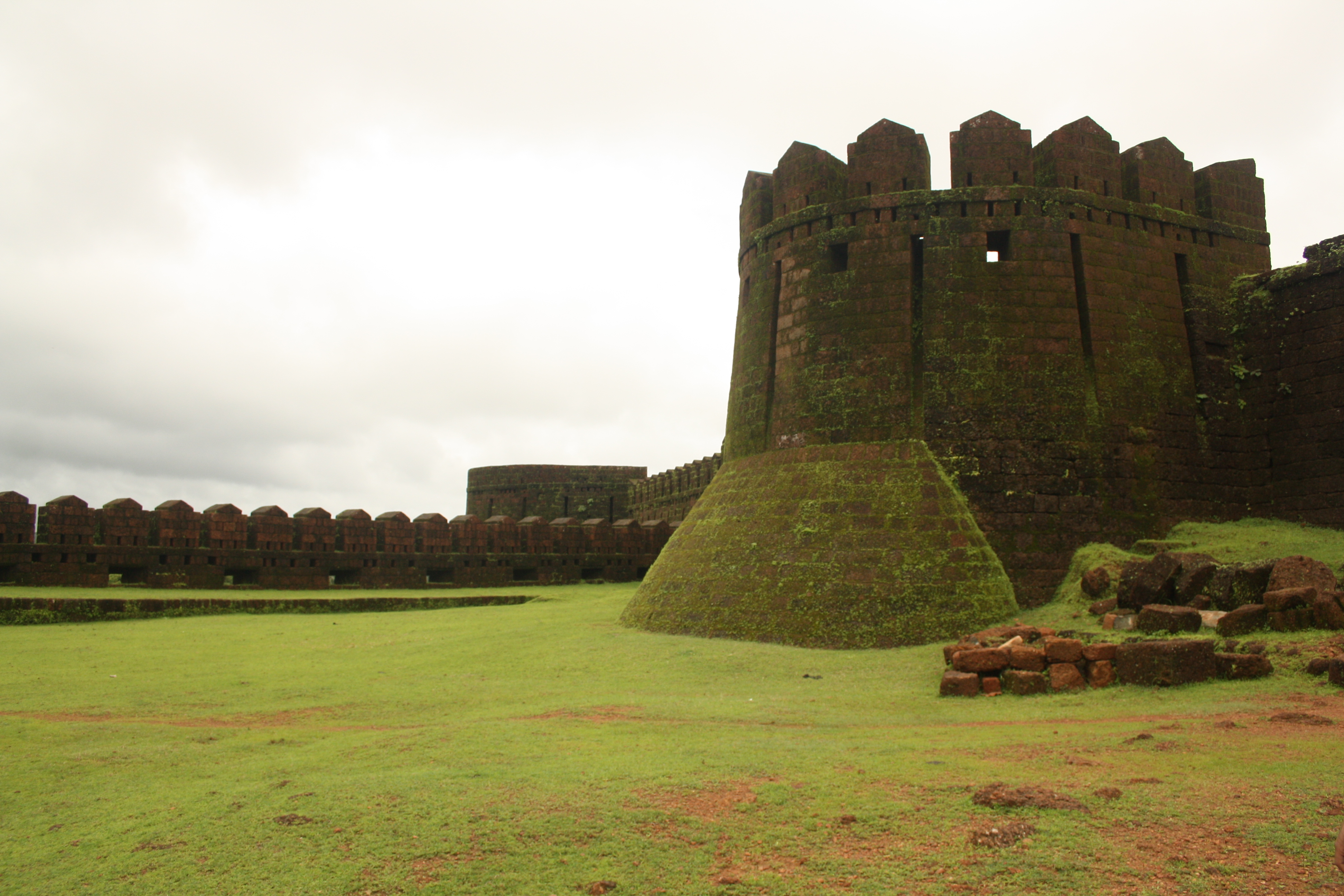
Mirjan Fort built by Chennabhairadevi, is located in present-day Uttara Kannada district.

Chennabhairadevi's kingdom consisted of Dakshina Goa, Uttara Kannada, Dakshina Kannada, Bhatkala, Malpe, Honnavara, Mirjan, Ankola, Byndur, and Karwar. Along with this coast, Bharangi, Marabidi, Karuru, Hannar, Bidanur, Saulnadu, Avinahalli regions on the Ghats were under the rule of Chennabhairadevi. Pepper, cinnamon, nutmeg, ginger and sandalwood were exported to Europe during her reign.

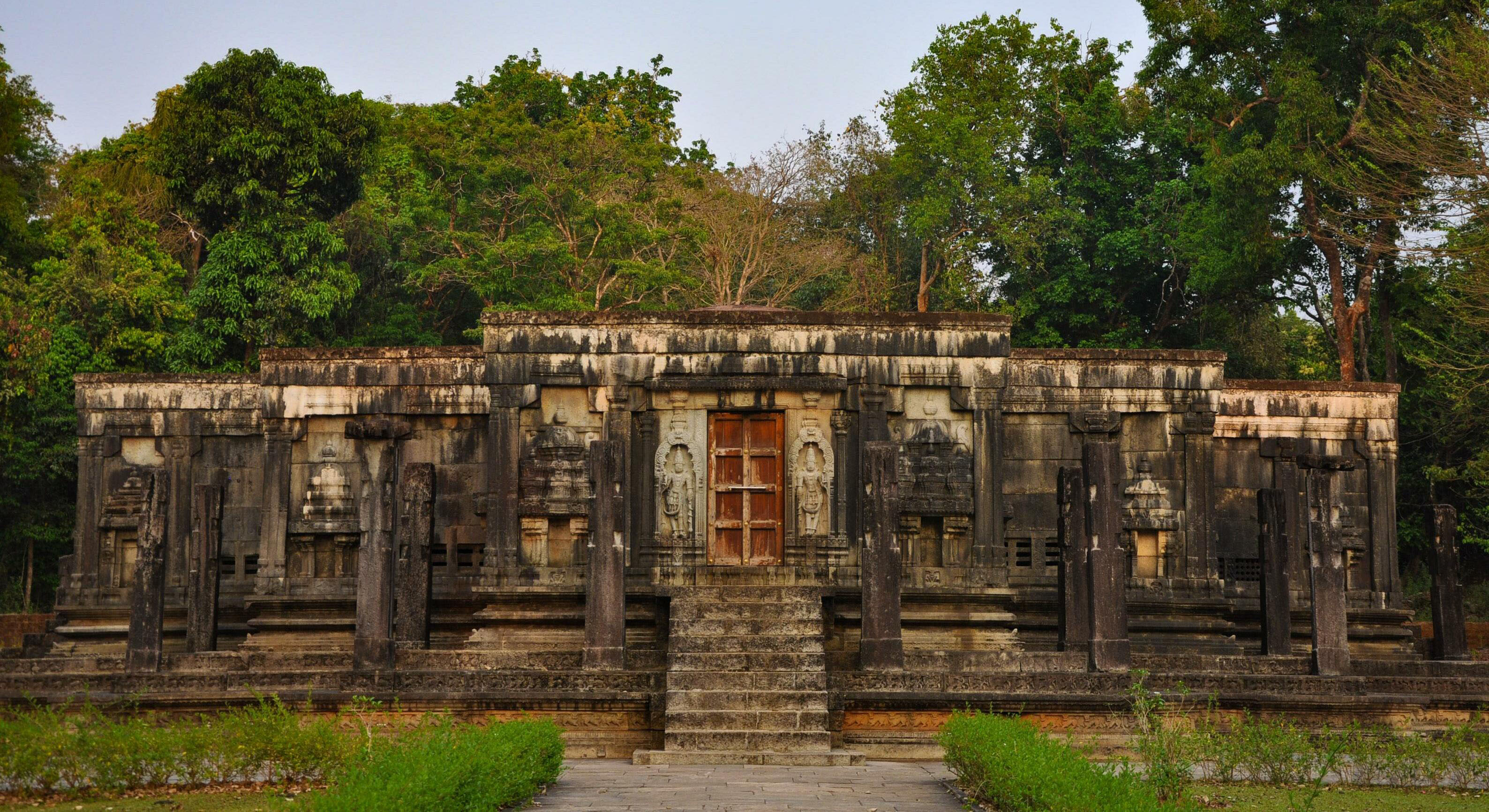
Chaturmukha Basadi in Gerusoppa

The remains of the Mirjan Fort and Kanur Fort from her reign can still be seen. She built the Chaturmukha Basadi in Karkala in 1562. The queen gave shelter in her kingdom to the Saraswat Brahmins and Konkanis who sought refuge in Chennabhairadevi's kingdom to escape the conversion by the Portuguese. A Jain Rani helped to build and renovate many Shaiva, Vaishnava and Shakti temples. The Rani also assisted in the renovation of Yoganarasimha Swami Temple and Vardhamana Basadi in Baderu or Venupura. Abhinava Bhattakalanka of the Swadi Digambara Jain Math, author of the grammar book "Karnataka Shabdanushasana", was under the patronage of this queen.

"Between Batikala (Bhatkala) and Goa there are places called Onor (Kanur), Marzen (Mirjan) and Ankola. I have heard that they export 5000 cruzados (a fifteenth century Portuguese gold coin) of pepper annually. These places were under the rule of the queen of Gerusoppe (Chennabhairadevi). These peppers are thicker, heavier and spicier than black pepper. These places should be taken under our control."

-Captain Alfonso Mexi of the Portuguese-held Cochin port.

== Wars against The Portuguese ==
The Queen fought against the Portuguese in 1559 and 1570 and won both wars. She also commanded the united army of 1571. This united army included many kings including the Sultans of Gujarat, the Sultans of Bidar, the Adil Shahis of Bijapur and the Jamorin rulers of Kerala.

== See also ==
- Abbakka Chowta
- Kittur Chennamma
- Onake Obavva
- Unniyarcha
- Keladi Chennamma
