= Bhogivarma =

- Dharmamahārājadhirāja

King of the Kadamba Kingdom
- Reign: c. 606 - 610 CE
- Predecessor: Ajavarma
- House: Kadamba

Bhogivarma (r. 606–610) was a Kadamba king.

== Life ==
He was born to Ajavarma.
