= Simhavarma =

- Dharmamahārājadhirāja

King of the Kadamba Kingdom
- Reign: c. 485 - 516 CE
- Predecessor: Vishnuvarma
- Successor: Krishnavarma II
- House: Kadamba
- Father: Vishnuvarma

Simhavarma (r. 485–516) was a Kadamba king.

== Life ==
Simhavarma was born to Vishnuvarma. His son and successor was Krishnavarma II. He is mentioned in copper plates of Bennahalli. His daughter was married to Madhava II of Western Ganga dynasty.
