= Mrigeshavarma =

- Dharmamahārājadhirāja

King of the Kadamba Kingdom
- Reign: c. 475 - 490 CE
- Predecessor: Shivamandhatruvarma
- Successor: Ravivarma
- Issue: Ravivarma
- House: Kadamba
- Father: Santivarma
- Religion: Jainism

Mrigeshavarma c. 475 was king from Kadamba dynasty and son of Santivarma. He came to the throne and faced the Pallavas and Gangas with considerable success. The Halasi plates describes him the "destroyer of the eminent family of the Gangas" and the "destructive fire" (pralayaanala) to the Pallavas. Mrigeshavarma was known to be a scholar and an expert in riding horses and elephants.

== Life ==
Mrigeshavarma was born to Santivarma of Kadamba dynasty. He dedicated an entire village to Jainism and its rituals. In one of his copper plates, there is mention of monks of Yapaniya sector of Jainism in the modern Belgaum district. He constructed a Jain temple in Palasika and donated land to Kurchaka sects. His son Ravivarma and grandson Harivarma were also devout followers of Jainism. His queen Prabhavati of the Kekaya family bore him a son called Ravivarma.
