= Ravivarma of Kadamba =

Ravivarma
- Dharmamahārājadhirāja

King of the Kadamba Kingdom
- Reign: c. 497- 537 CE
- Predecessor: Mrigeshavarma
- Successor: Harivarma
- House: Kadamba
- Father: Mrigeshavarma
- Religion: Jainism

Ravivarma c. 497 was king from Kadamba dynasty and son of Mrigeshavarma.

== Personal life ==
Ravivarma was the son of Mrigeshavarma and Prabhavati of the Kekaya family. Following the reign of Kakusthavarma, he (c. 485–519) succeeded in restoring the kingdom to its former strength during a long and eventful rule. Inscriptions from his reign, spanning the fifth to the thirty-fifth regnal years, provide detailed accounts of his achievements, which included both internal family disputes and military campaigns against the Pallavas and the Gangas. He is also credited with a victory over the Vakatakas. A Mahadeva temple constructed during his reign is mentioned in a contemporary Greek account. According to the Gudnapur inscription, he successfully subdued smaller rulers such as the Punnatas, Alupas, Kongalvas, and the Pandyas of Uchangi. He was succeeded by his son Harivarma.

His land grants to Mahadeva temple on request of Nilakantha, his royal physician, is mentioned in Sirsi grant records.

== Extent of the Kingdom ==
The Davanagere copper plates of Kadamba king Ravivarma, dated 519 CE, provide evidence of the wide-ranging suzerainty he exercised during his reign (c. 485–519 CE). According to historian D. C. Sircar, these records indicate that Ravivarma’s authority extended across much of South India, from the Narmada River in the north to the Kaveri river near Talakad, the capital of the Western Ganga, in the south. The inscriptions suggest that the people of these regions recognized his protection. This evidence implies that during his rule, probably sometime after 500 CE, the Kadambas successfully conquered the Vakataka kingdom and incorporated it into their territory.
