= Nimi =

Nimi may refer to

- Nimi (king), a king of the Solar dynasty in Hindu and Jain mythology
- Nimi language, spoken in Papua New Guinea
- Niimi, Okayama, Japan
- Non-Instrumental Movement Inhibition, an aspect of body language
