= Gerusoppa =

- village
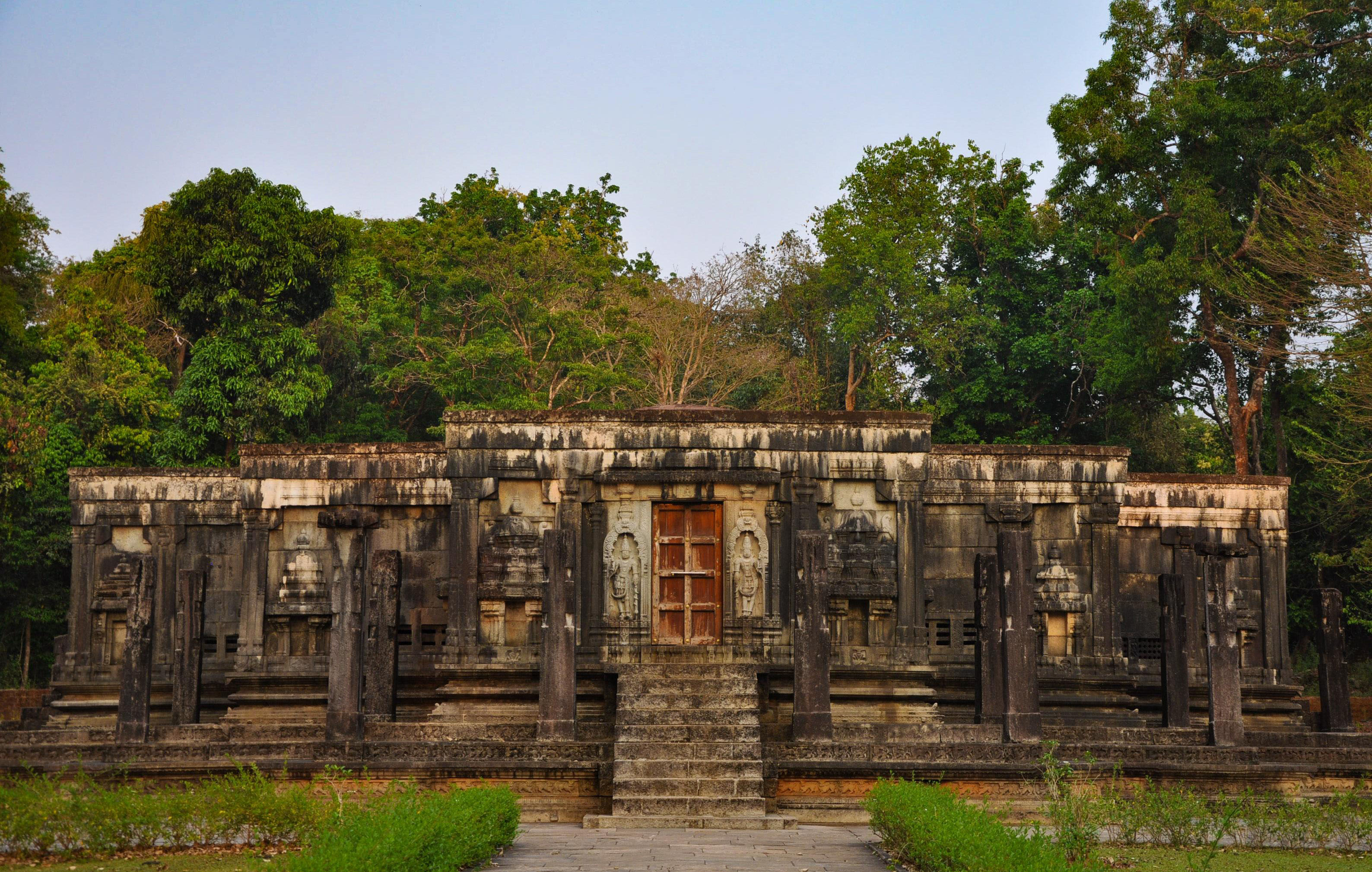
- Chaturmukha basadi, Gerusoppa

- Location in Karnataka, India
- Coordinates: 14°14′19.91″N 74°44′28.1″E
- Country: India
- State: Karnataka
- Region: Kanara
- District: Uttara Kannada
- Taluk: Honnavar
- Elevation: 48 m (157 ft)

Languages
  - Official: Kannada
- Time zone: UTC+5:30 (IST)
- Postal code: 581384
- Vehicle registration: KA-47

Gerusoppa is a village in Honnavar Taluk in Uttara Kannada District in the Indian state of Karnataka. The village is also known as Nagarbastikeri and comes under Nagarbastikeri Panchayat. It was capital of Salva dynasty between 14th and 15th century AD with queen Rani Chennabhairadevi.

== Chaturmukha Basadi ==
Chaturmukha Basadi is a 16th century symmetrical Jain temples located in Gerusoppa and is considered one of the most important center in the region.

== Education ==
Local colleges include B.g.V.S Arts, commerce and Science College, Shri Guru Sudhindra College, A. V. Baliga College of Arts and Science, Government College, Gajanana Secondary School, G Pu College Allanki and Sri Subramanya P U Kavalakki and shiri shardamba pu college.

Schools for younger students include New English School (unaided) and S F S Kodani.

== Transportation ==
Honnavar Railway Station and Manki Railway Station are the nearest railway stations.Talaguppa railway station also 1 hr 45 min away from gerasoppa by bus people who wants to travel to Bangalore this route is one of the option, but 1hr ghat road(section) is there so avoid this route when weather conditions are bad mainly two wheelers and who are new to driving. daily two trains are present from talaguppa to banglore

== See also ==
- Rani Chennabhairadevi
- Unchalli Falls
- Apsarakonda
- Murudeshwar
- Mangalore
- Kumta
- Jog falls
- Jain basadi
