= Harivarma =

- Dharmamahārājadhirāja

King of the Kadamba Kingdom
- Reign: c. 537 - 547 CE
- Predecessor: Ravivarma
- Successor: Krishnavarma II
- House: Kadamba
- Father: Ravivarma
- Religion: Jainism

Harivarma c. 542 was king from Kadamba dynasty and son of Ravivarma. Harivarma made generous donations to support Jainism and its rituals.

== History ==
=== Personal life ===
Harivarma moved his capital from Kolar, Karnataka to Talakad. He was the last known ruler of the original Banavasi branch of the Kadamba dynasty. His reign marked the decline of this line, as power in Banavasi later passed to the Triparvata branch. Krishnavarma II of that branch defeated Harivarma and brought Banavasi back under his family’s control.
