= Honnavar =

- Town
- Honnavar
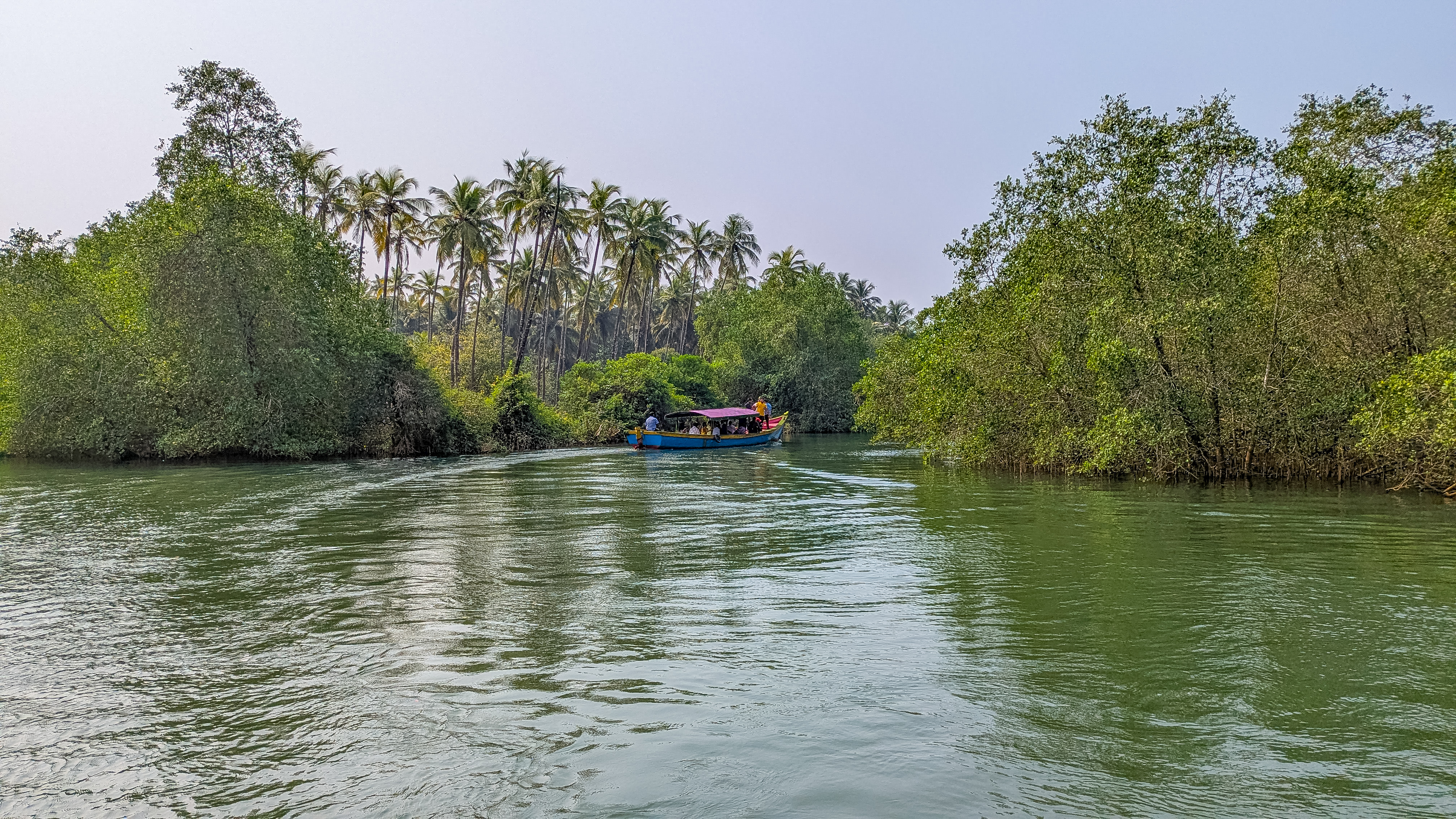
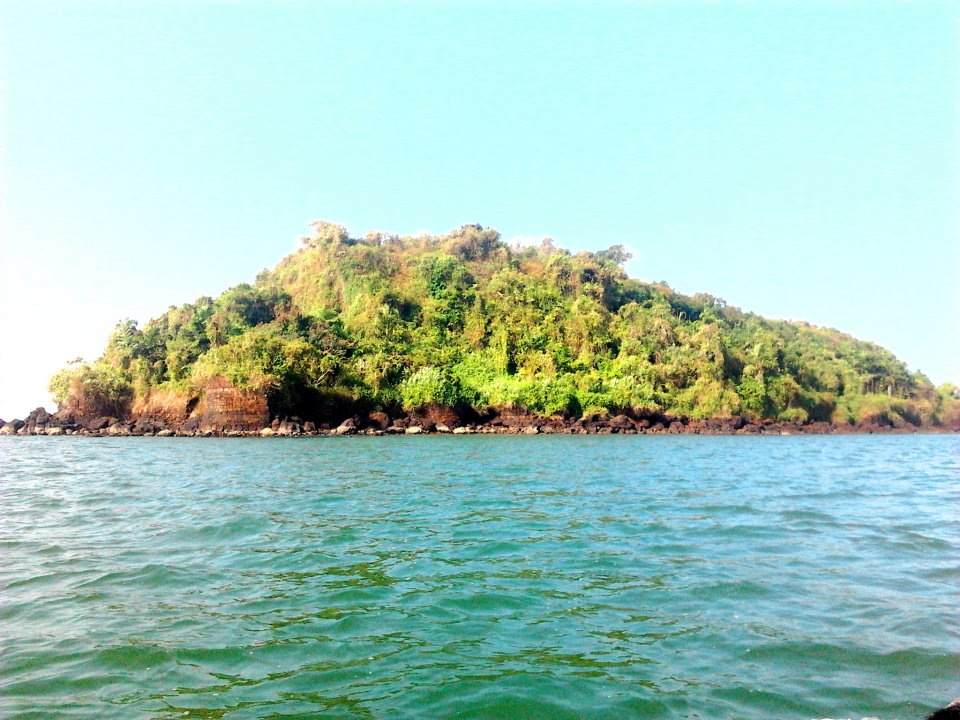
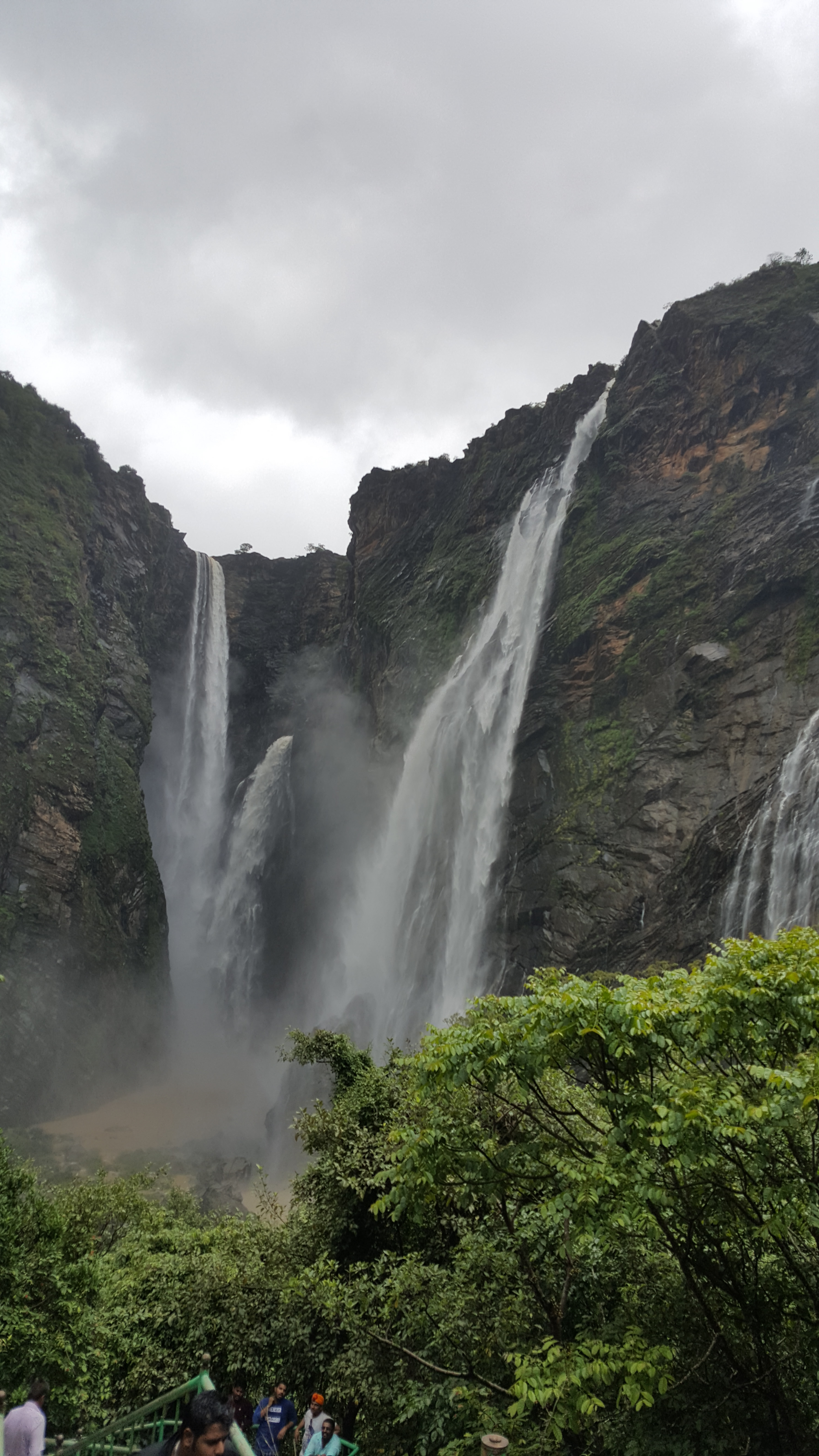
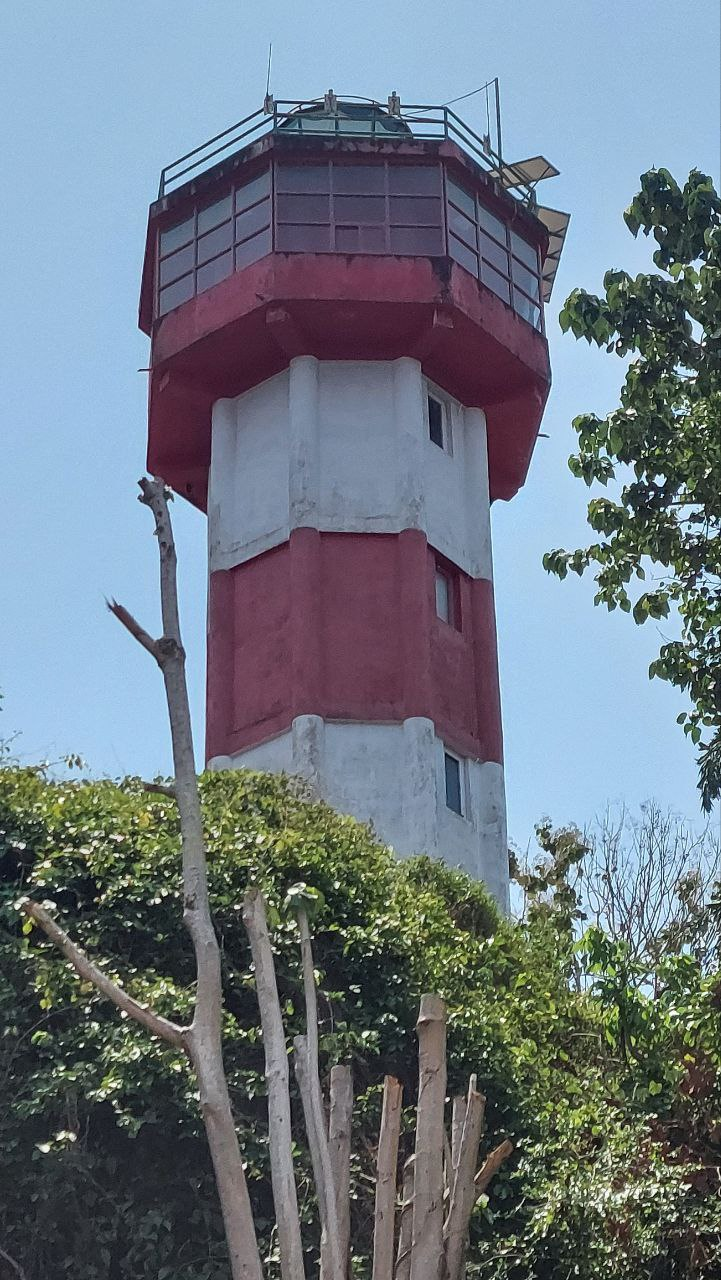
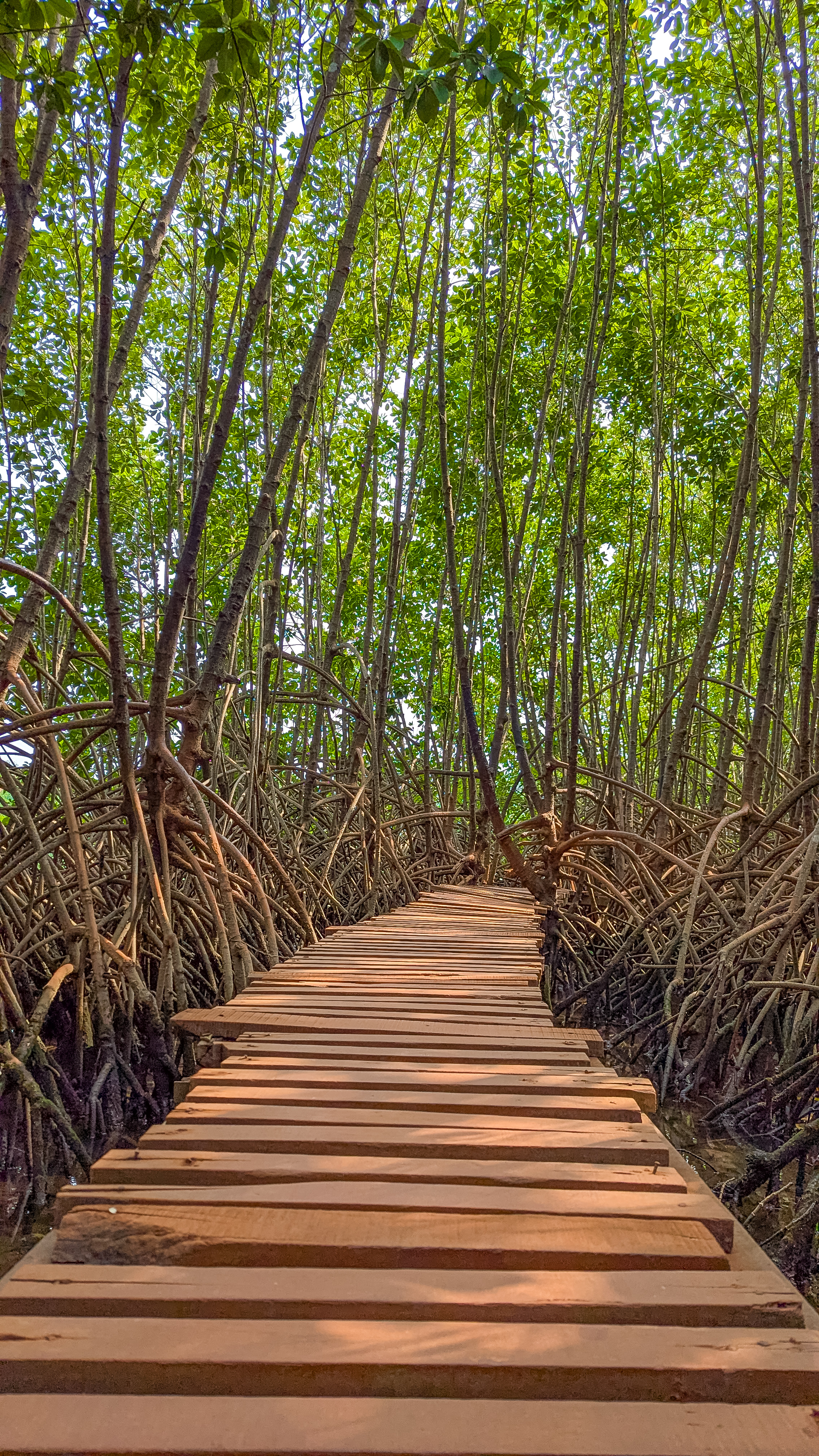
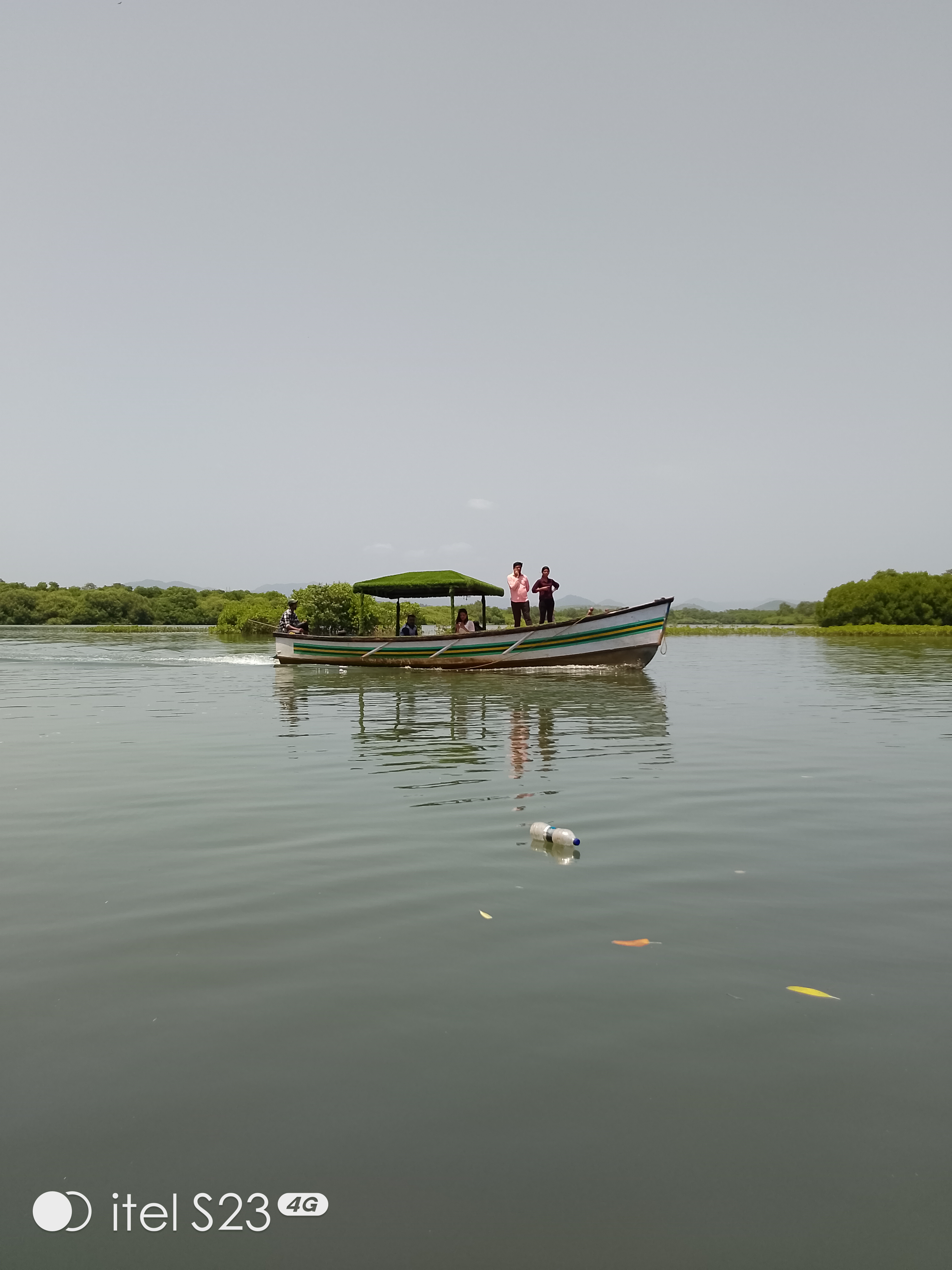
- From top: Honnavar backwaters, Basavaraja Durga Island, Jog falls, Honnavar lighthouse, Honnavar mangrove boardwalk and backwaters boating

- Location within Karnataka
- Coordinates: 14.28°N 74.4439°E
- Country: India
- State: Karnataka
- Region: Uttara Kannada district
- Elevation: 2 m (6.6 ft)

Population (2011)
  - Total: 19,109

Languages
  - Official: Kannada
- Time zone: UTC+5:30 (IST)
- Honnavar Town Panchayat: Municipality

Map of Honnavar Taluk

Honnavar or Honavar is a town, taluka in Uttara Kannada district of Karnataka, India.

== History ==
Honnavar is a port town in Coastal Karnataka known for its beautiful landscapes and rich history. The port hosted foreign traders from the Arab world, as well as later from European countries such as Portugal, England and the Netherlands. In 1342, it was visited by the Moroccan traveller Ibn Battuta, where he spoke about their social, economic, religious, cultural, and administrative factors. He describes the Sultan Jamaluddin as one of the best and most powerful rulers.

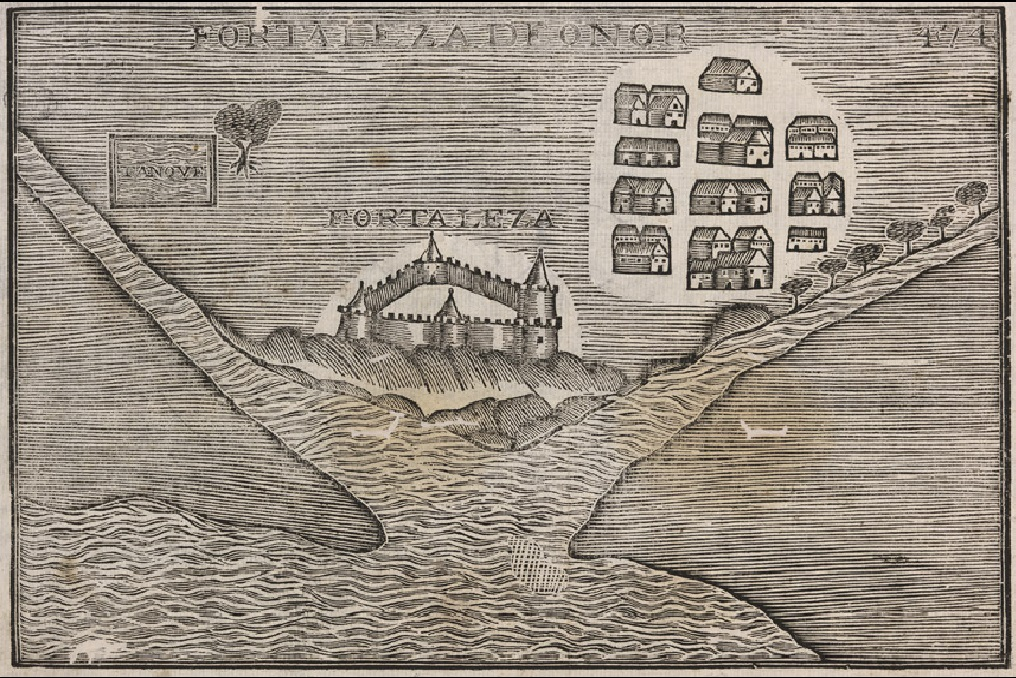
Image of the Portuguese fort

== Portuguese rule ==
During the Portuguese domination, a fortress was built in the 16th century to protect trade in the Indian Ocean. Later in the 18th century, the English built warehouses at the port.

== Transportation ==
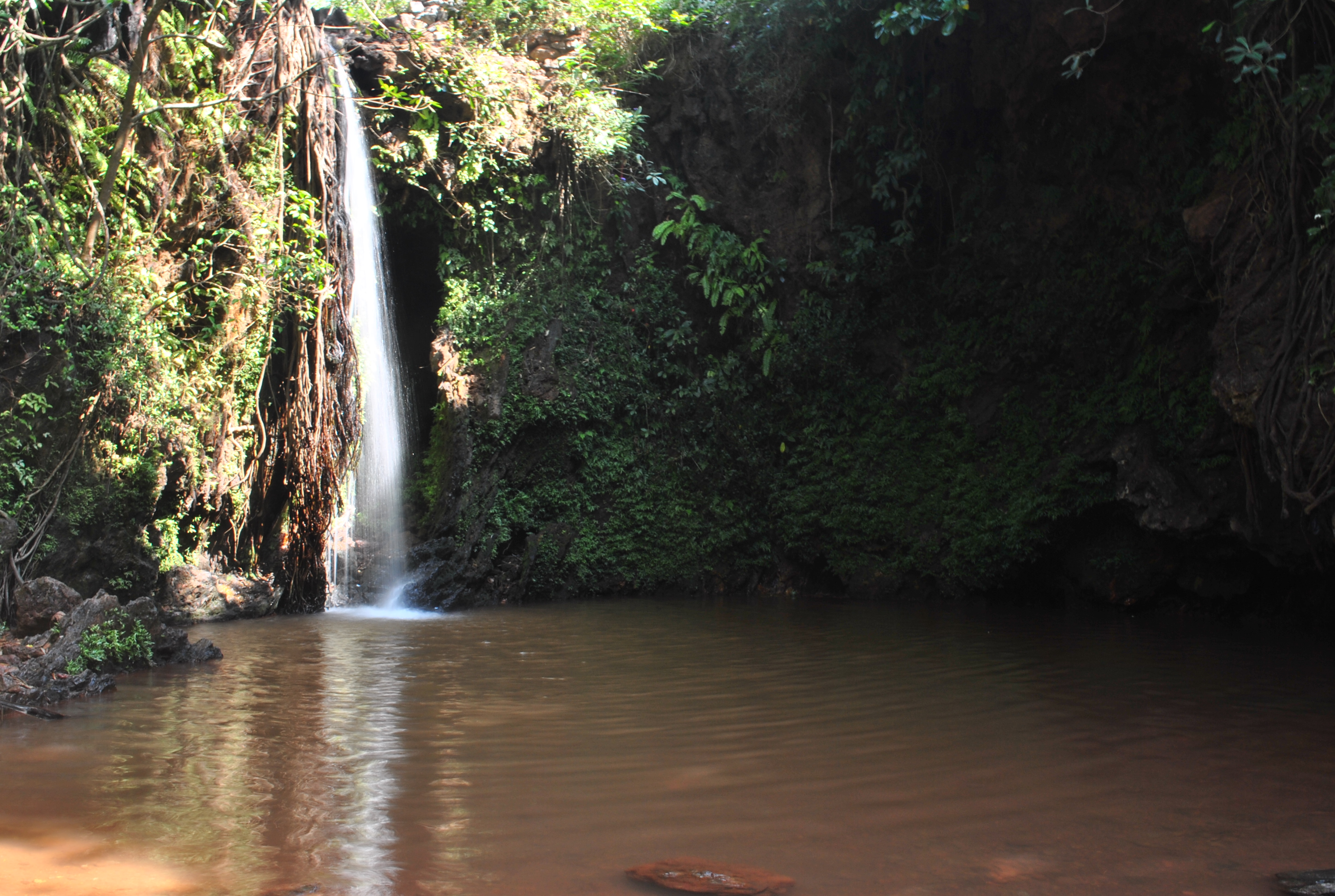
Apsarakonda Falls

Rail

The Konkan Railway line passes through Honnavar, and its longest bridge is 2.065 km in length and is in Honnavar, over the Sharavati River.

Sea

In October 2013 the Karnataka government announced plans to develop a new port at Honnavar, to be funded by a public–private partnership (PPP) model.

Inland water

There are proposals for improvements to the Inland Water Transportation system between Honnavar and Gerusoppa along the Sharavati river coast. Also, the Office of Ferries Inspector (Mangalore Circle) that oversees Inland Water Transportation System of the entire coastal belt of Karnataka State is headquartered at Honnavar.

== Climate ==
Climate data for Honnavar (1991–2020, extremes 1939–2020)
Month	Jan	Feb	Mar	Apr	May	Jun	Jul	Aug	Sep	Oct	Nov	Dec	Year
Record high °C (°F)	37.7 (99.9)	38.6 (101.5)	38.8 (101.8)	37.5 (99.5)	38.5 (101.3)	35.4 (95.7)	33.7 (92.7)	32.2 (90.0)	34.1 (93.4)	37.1 (98.8)	37.0 (98.6)	37.2 (99.0)	38.8 (101.8)
Mean daily maximum °C (°F)	33.0 (91.4)	32.7 (90.9)	32.7 (90.9)	33.2 (91.8)	33.2 (91.8)	30.0 (86.0)	28.6 (83.5)	28.7 (83.7)	29.7 (85.5)	31.6 (88.9)	33.5 (92.3)	33.6 (92.5)	31.7 (89.1)
Mean daily minimum °C (°F)	20.1 (68.2)	20.3 (68.5)	22.8 (73.0)	25.0 (77.0)	25.8 (78.4)	24.3 (75.7)	23.8 (74.8)	23.7 (74.7)	23.6 (74.5)	23.5 (74.3)	22.8 (73.0)	21.6 (70.9)	23.1 (73.6)
Record low °C (°F)	13.5 (56.3)	14.2 (57.6)	17.4 (63.3)	20.4 (68.7)	20.5 (68.9)	20.3 (68.5)	19.6 (67.3)	19.4 (66.9)	18.2 (64.8)	18.3 (64.9)	15.6 (60.1)	14.9 (58.8)	13.5 (56.3)
Average rainfall mm (inches)	0.4 (0.02)	0.0 (0.0)	3.5 (0.14)	16.0 (0.63)	114.1 (4.49)	995.7 (39.20)	1,161 (45.71)	814.9 (32.08)	366.2 (14.42)	216.1 (8.51)	37.1 (1.46)	7.5 (0.30)	3,732.4 (146.94)
Average rainy days	0.1	0.0	0.1	1.2	5.2	22.7	28.6	26.0	15.6	8.6	2.0	0.4	110.4
Average relative humidity (%) (at 17:30 IST)	56	60	67	68	71	85	89	88	82	77	62	54	71
Source: India Meteorological Department
