= Nawayath Sultanate =

Sultanate in Karnataka to 1340

- Late 13th century–1350s
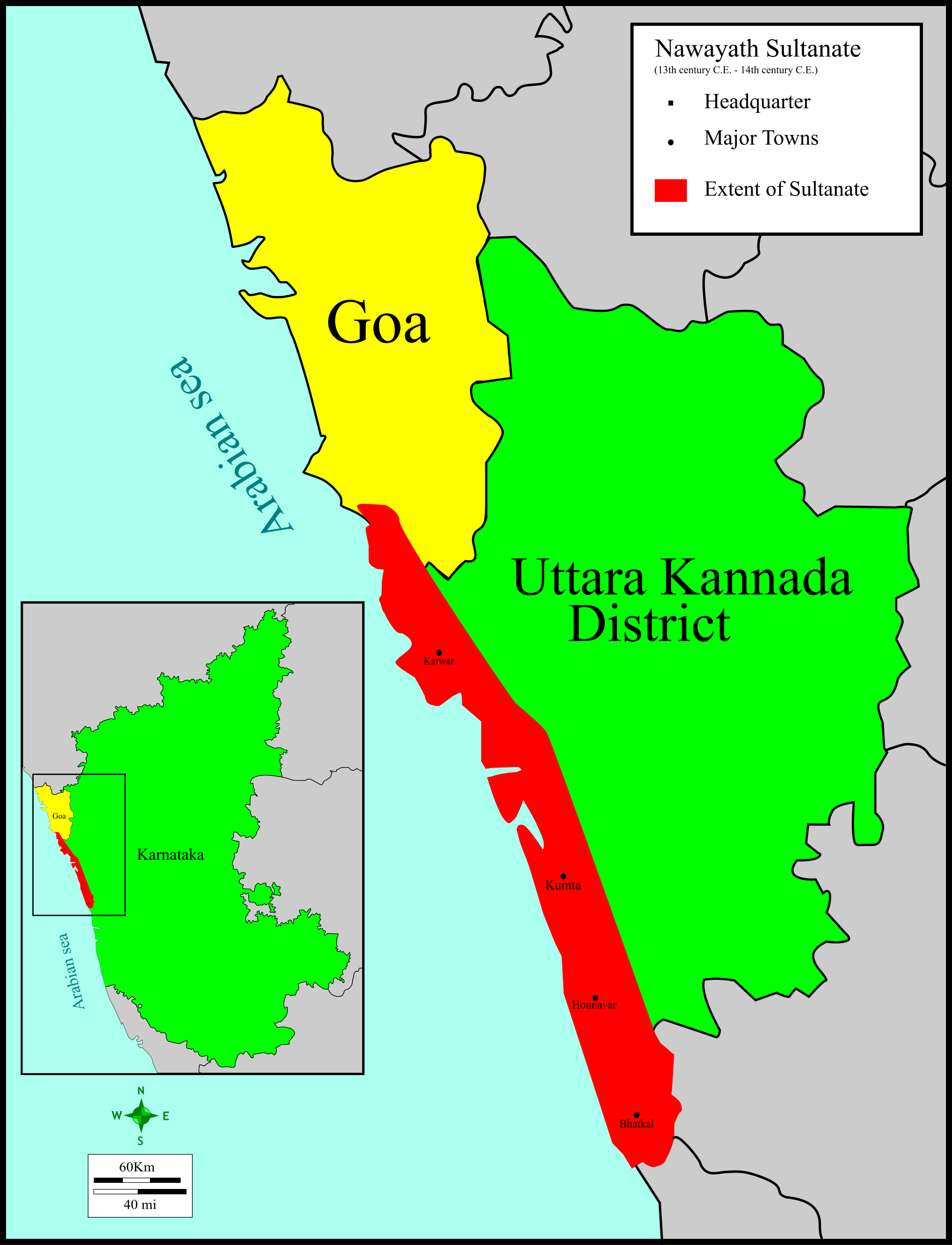
- Extent of Nawayath Sultanate
- Status: Independent Kingdom until 1340 A.D. Subordinate to Unknown Kingdom of Gersoppa from 1340. (Note: According to Goarge Moraes, "The first record of Harihara I in Kanara is dated Sarvadhari A.D. 1348, when his minister Gautarasa was ruling the Mangalore.")
- Capital: Honnavar
- Common languages: Konkani; Kannada; Nawayathi
- Religion: Islam
- Government: Monarchy
- Sultan
  - Late 13th Century–Early 14th Century: Hasan Nakhuda
  - Early 14th century–1350s: Jamaluddin Nakhuda
- Historical era: Medieval
  - Established: Late 13th century
  - Disestablished: 1350s
Preceded by	Succeeded by
Alupa Dynasty; Kadambas of Goa	Vijayanagara Empire; Suluva Jain Dynasty
- Today part of: India

Nawayath Sultanate (13th century C.E. to 14th century C.E.), also known as the Hunnur Sultanate, was a small kingdom situated on the Karavali coast in the present-day Uttara Kannada district of Karnataka. It is believed to have been established by the Nawayath merchant Hasan Nakhuda at Hospattan, a village in Honnavar. The sultanate remained sovereign until 1340, when Harihara-nripala, the ruler of the neighboring kingdom of Gersoppa, which controlled the eastern region of the sultanate, asserted his suzerainty over Sultan Jamaluddin. Unlike most kingdoms of the Indian subcontinent, the Nawayath Sultanate was adept in marine warfare and possessed two notable ships, the Tarida and the Ukairi. (Note: The Ukairi was a long, pointed, low, and uncovered warship capable of propulsion by both sails and oars. It was equipped with sixty oars and could be fitted with a roof during wartime for protection. In contrast, the Tarida was a vessel designed to support mounted combat, constructed with an interior that allowed a rider to mount a horse, don armor, and emerge ready for battle.)

Nawayath Sultanate patronized numerous architectural works, though most have fallen into ruin, become uninhabitable, or been lost over time. Among these were a mosque constructed by Sultan Hasan Nakhuda, noted for its resemblance to the grand mosque of Baghdad, as well as the Mirjan Fort and the Fort of Hospattan in Honnavar.

== Origin ==
The Sultan Hasan and Jamaluddin were from the Nawayath community, who are descendants of the Arabs. The term has been given different meanings by different authors, such as Suyuti, who describes Nawayath as the corrupt word of Banu-Wayat; it means children of Wayat who are the descendants of Abdullah-Wayat. Conversely, Jafar Sharif presents an alternative origin, asserting that it comes from the Arabic term 'Nuwa-A-ay-t'hay', which translates to 'newcomer'. Wilk supports the meaning given by Jafar Sharif but he describes the word Nevayet has the indian origin which may be the corruption of Hindustani and Marathi terms. Another opinion is that it is apparently a Konkani word connected with Sanskrit nava (i.e., new) and implying new convert.

Victor D'Souza concluded by not being satisfied with the perspectives provided by various authors. He asserts that it is implausible that the term navayat is the widespread distortion of the expressions for "newcomer" in several languages. Nor is it likely that individuals speaking different languages collectively chose the Sanskrit terms, as if by mutual agreement, to designate these newcomers. Furthermore, other expressions, such as those who arrived by boat or new converts, cannot be deemed as accurate terms. However, he determined that sailors represent a sensible interpretation of Navayats.

== History ==
=== Hasan Nakhuda ===
Jamaluddin Nakhuda's father, according to Ibn-e Batuta's narrative, erected a huge mosque similar to Grand Mosque of Baghdad after capturing Sindapur and founded a city there. Hasan Nakhuda may have served as governor of Sindapur under Kadambas, like in the 11th century, a Muslim named Sadhan, son of Muhammad of Arabia, who served as governor.

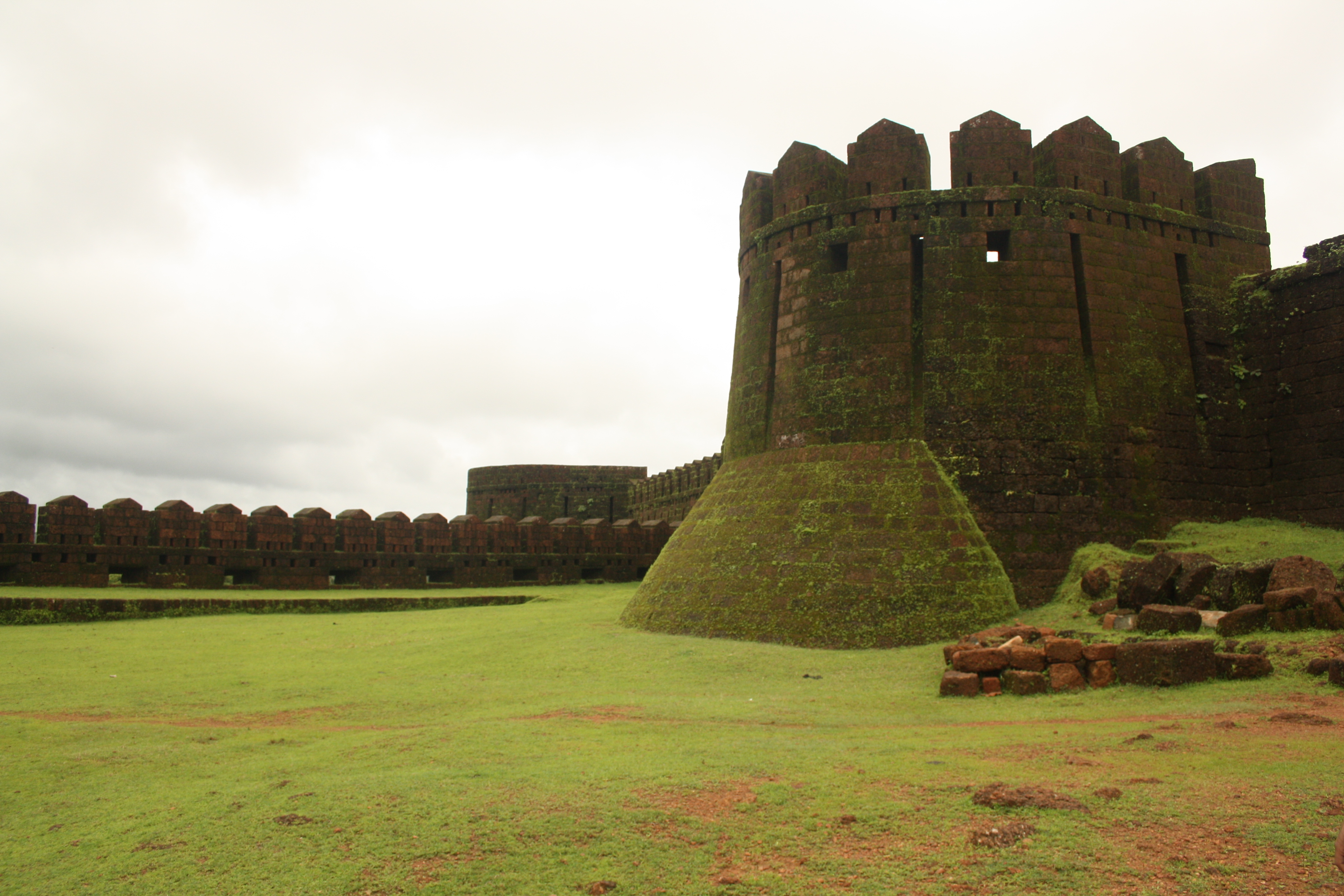
Mirjan Fort Initially built by Kings of Nawayaths in 13th C.E., is located in present-day Uttara Kannada district.

=== Jamaluddin Nakhuda ===
Sultan Jamaluddin Muhammed was pious to his religious duties and was one of the powerful rulers on the coast of Kanara. Tributes were paid to him by the Malabar king on a yearly basis because of his maritime power. In 1338, Vira Ballala III stationed his army at Barkur to check the aggressive activities of Sultan Jamaluddin, who was threatening to overthrow the alupa king, the brother-in-law and vassal of Vira Ballala III. In 1343, a fleet of 52 vessels departed for Sindapur upon receiving a message from the king of Sindapur's son, leading to the capture of Sindapur. Subsequently, in 1344, the king of Sindapur launched a surprise assault while the Sultanate's army was scattered throughout the region, with no available information on the outcome of this conflict.

== Cultural Influence ==
Hindus and Jains were impacted by the religious and moral code of Muslims. When it comes to the art of fighting, they imitate Muslims, while in the ground force and navy, the majority of officers were Muslim. Conversely, the livelihood of Muslims was shaped by Jains. It was common to use hot water and rice, yet wheat could be readily imported from other nations. Each individual was provided with a separate plate and spoon for dining. Moreover, on a plate with rice, various types of curries were placed, a practice influenced by Hindus that persists to this day.

Mžik says that Shaikh Muhammed Nagauri considered his male and female slaves unclean and did not have his food prepared by them because of his belief in untouchability.

Mahdi Husain rejects Mžik's remark about untouchability. According to him, the aforementioned Shaikh was a saint with strict habits who carefully avoided any chance of contamination or impurity when performing his devotional practice. For this reason, he was concerned about his servants.

== Education ==
There were 13 educational institutions dedicated to the education of female students, while 23 schools catered to the male student population. Furthermore, the female population during that historical period displayed a remarkable proficiency in memorizing the Quran. It is evident that there is a surplus of individuals holding the titles of alim and fazil residing within the specified geographical region.

== Travellers ==
=== Friar Jordanus ===
In the year 1328, a French missionary and explorer embarked on a visit to the kingdom, during which he meticulously documented a detailed and succinct narrative recounting his expedition to Bhatigala, a place also recognized as Bhatkal. Historical records indicate that the ruler of Bhatigala was affiliated with the Saracens, denoting his adherence to the Islamic faith. According to the insights of Yule, it is probable that Jordanus was making a veiled reference to the sovereign of Honnavar, thereby shedding light on the intricate web of political and religious dynamics prevalent during that era.

=== Ibn Battuta ===
The Moroccan traveler Ibn Battuta visited the sultanate in 1343. According to Ibn Battuta, "The sultan of Hunnur, Jamal-ud-din Muhammad, son of Hasan, is one of the best and most powerful rulers, but he is subordinate to a heathen raja (Sultan) named Haryab." He met Faqqi Ismail (also known as Faqqi Ismail Sukri) of Bhatkal (Note: In the article titled "Bhatkal Thousand Year old Party System," the author states that Faqqi Ismail Sukri was the Khateeb (orator) of Bhatkal at the time it was visited by Ibn Battuta.) and the local Qazi Nuruddin Ali, and received hospitality from Shaikh Muhammed Nagauri (an-Naqauri). He speaks about their social, economic, religious, cultural, and administrative factors. He fought a battle of Sindapur alongside them and returned with victory; a year later, under uncertain circumstances, he was unable to return to Hunnur without giving further account.

== See also ==
- Alupa Dynasty
- Kadambas of Goa
- Nayakas of Ikkeri
- Bhatkal
- Honnavar
- Mirjan Fort
