= Karki =

Karki may refer to:

- Karki, Azerbaijan, a landlocked exclave of Azerbaijan
- Karki, Honnavar, a village in Honnavar Taluk in Uttara Kannada district of Karnataka state in India
- Karki, Madhya Pradesh, a village in Shahdol district in the state of Madhya Pradesh in India
- Karki (surname), a surname originating from Nepal
- Karki (name), name list

== See also ==
- Karri (disambiguation)
