= Apsarakonda =

Village in Karnataka, India

Apsarkonda
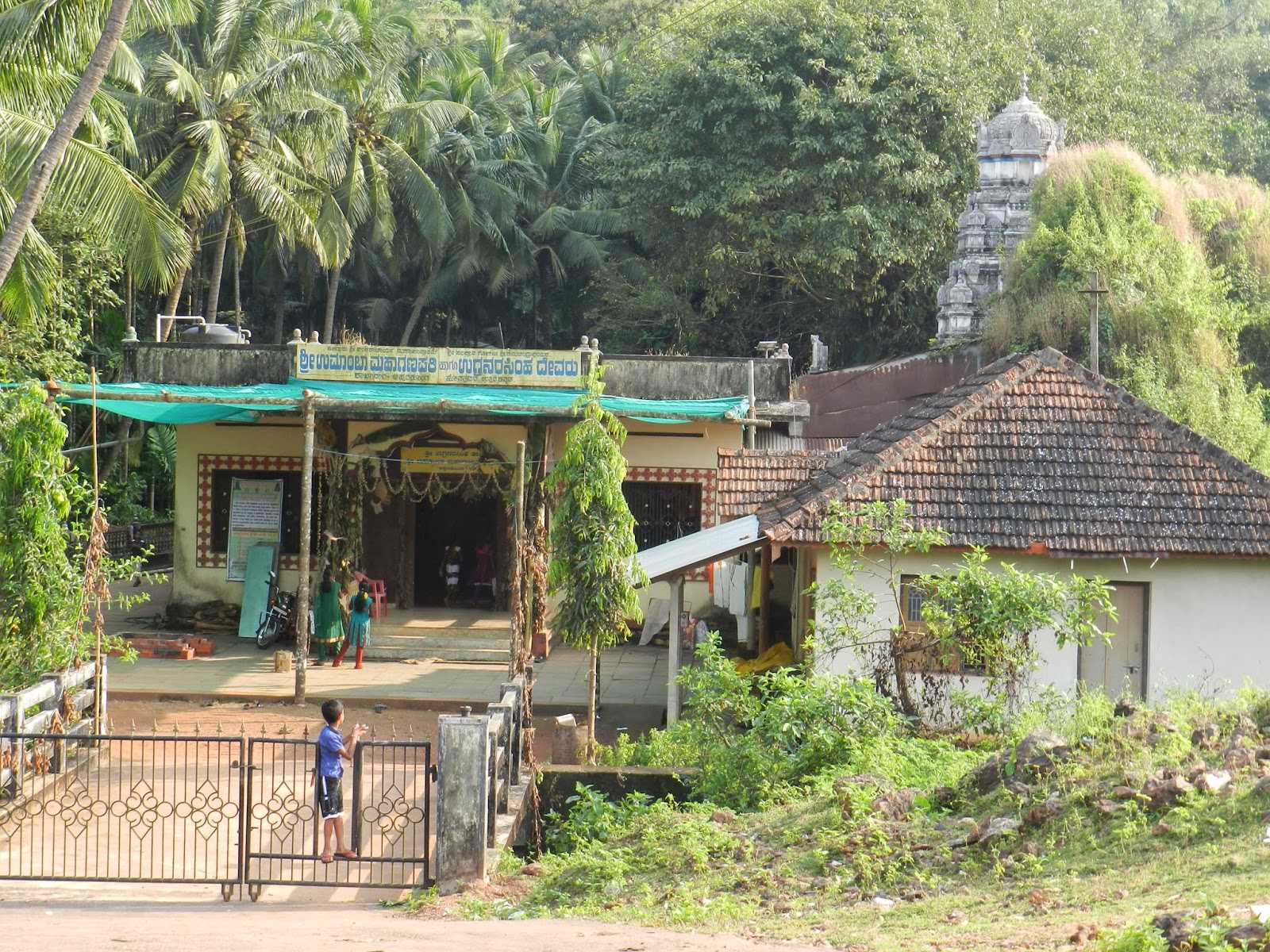
- Apsarakonda Temple

- Location within Karnataka Location within India
- Coordinates: 14.231°N 74.446°E
- Country: India
- State: Karnataka
- Region: Canara
- District: Uttara Kannada
- Taluk: Honnavar

Languages
  - Official: Kannada

Apsarkonda is an emerging tourist village near Honnavar, in the district of Uttara Kannada, Karnataka, India. It is situated 8 km from the Honnavar bus stand.

== Etymology ==
Apsarkonda means Pond of Angels. This is named after a pond facing the beach. The legend associated with the name of the waterfall is that it was the chosen place of the angels to take a bath and relax.

== Attractions ==
There is the Maha Ganapati and Ugra Narasimha temple, behind which the Apsarkonda waterfalls are found. There is a Pandava cave that is of historical significance. According to mythology, the Pandavas stayed here during their Vanavasa. There is a park near the falls maintained by the forest department. The Kelginoor lagoon near the beach is also a tourist attraction. Apsarkonda is known for its unexplored beaches.

== Gallery ==
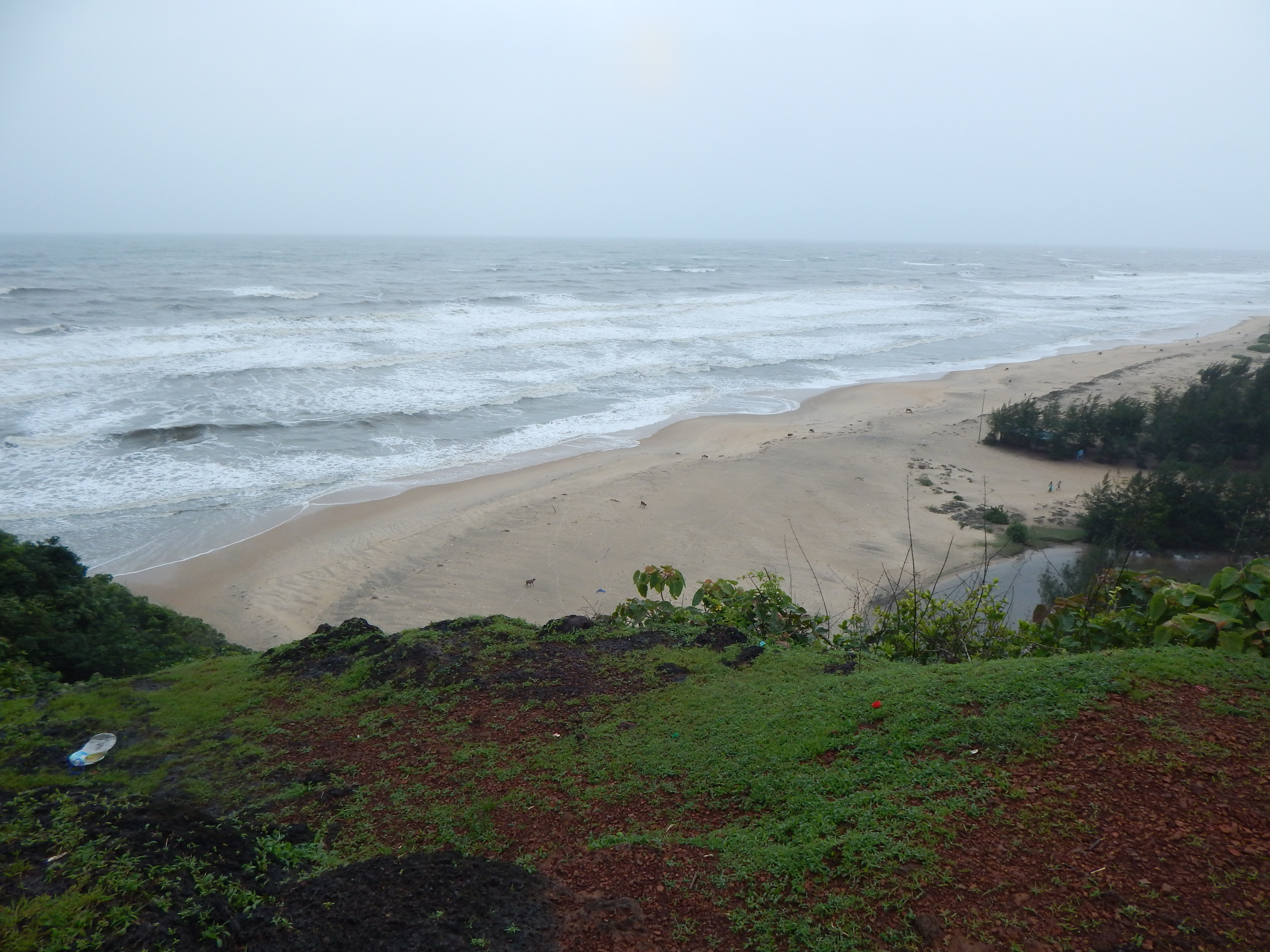
Kelginoor pond facing the beach

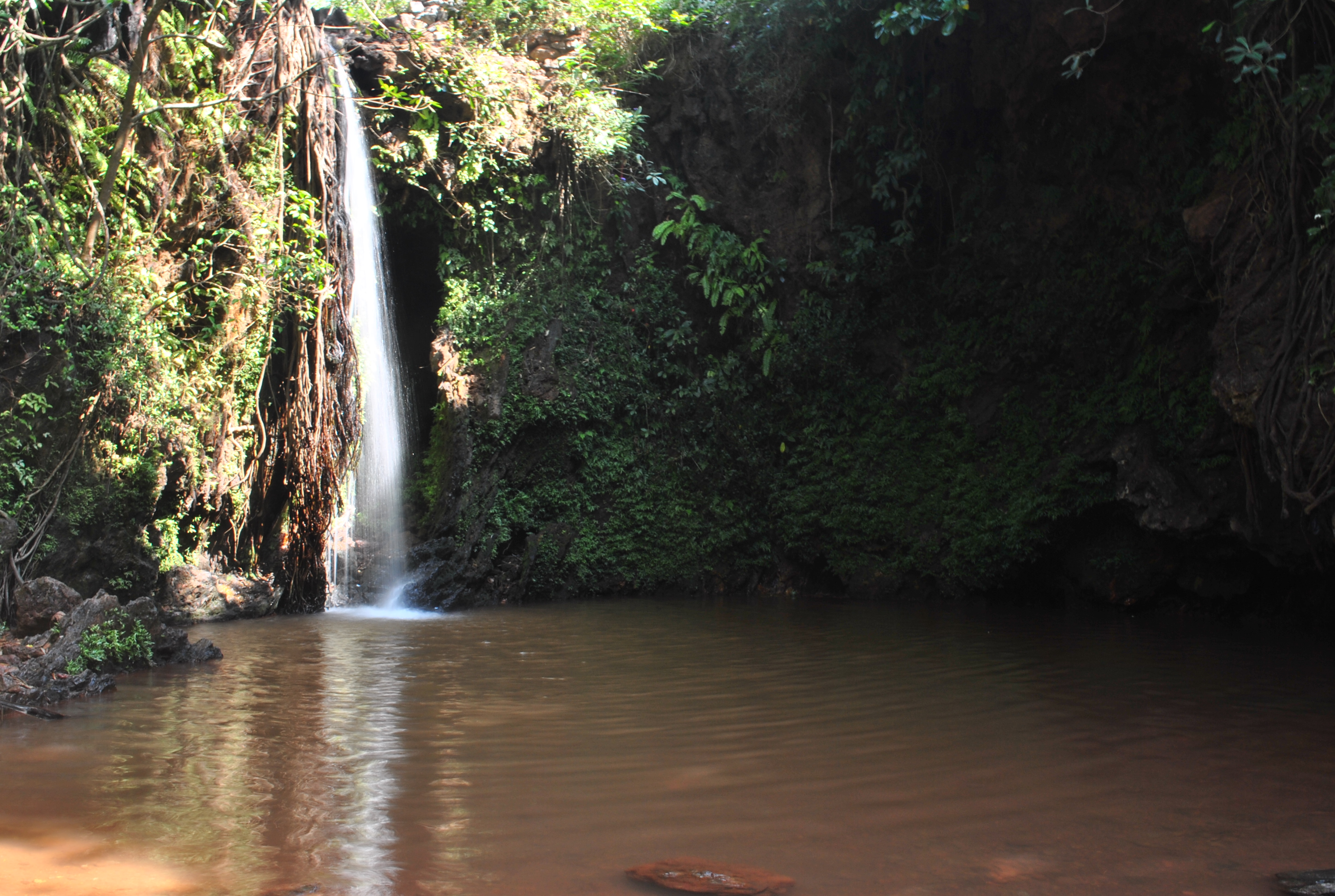
Falls

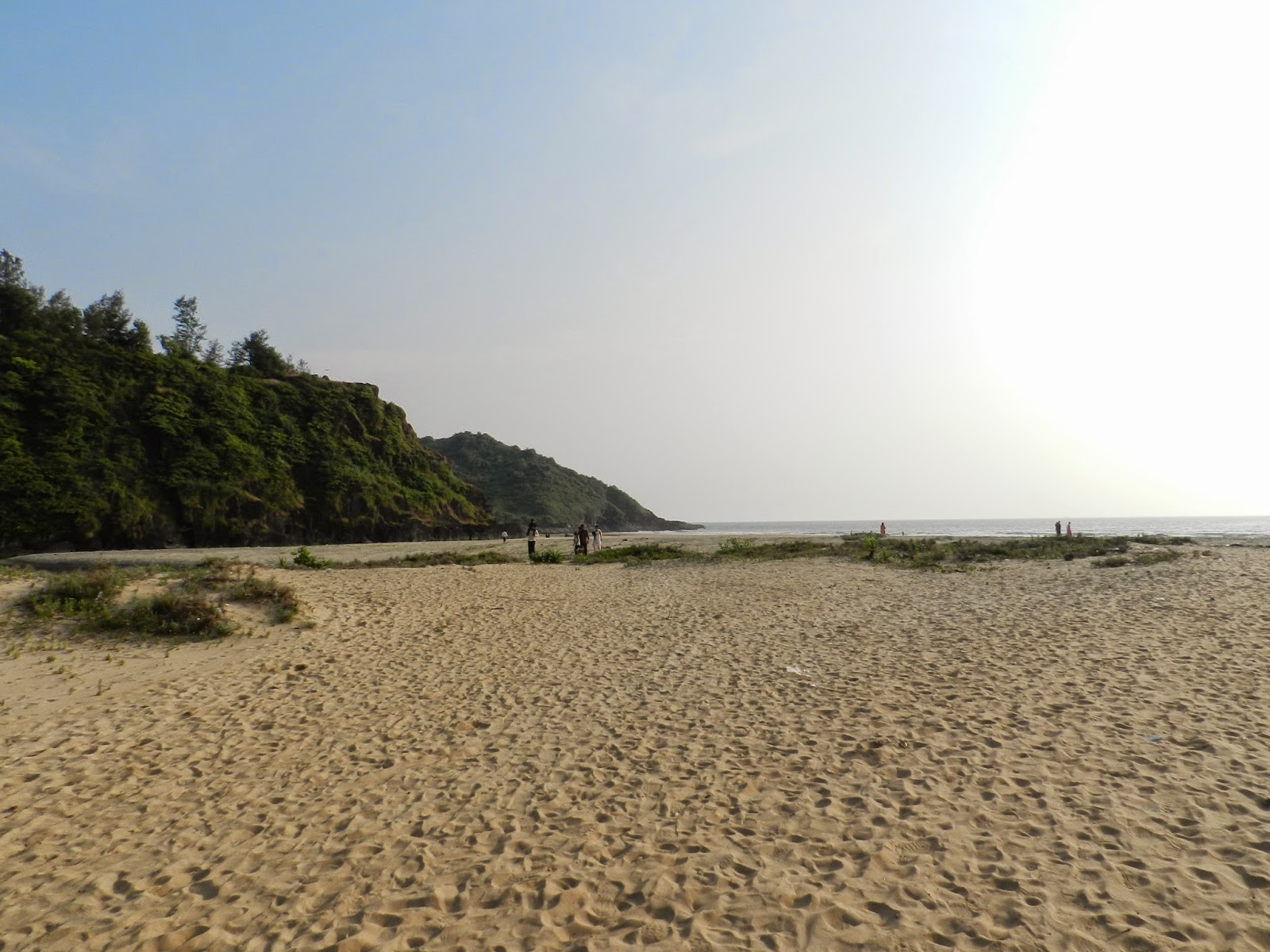
Beach

== See also ==
- Mangalore
- Karwar
- Shri Karikaana Parameshwari
