= Hospattan =

Village in Uttara Kannada, Karnataka, India

- Village
- Location in Karnataka, India Hospattan (India)
- Coordinates: 14.24°N 74.45°E
- Country: India
- State: Karnataka
- District: Uttara Kannada
- Taluk: Honnavar

Government
  - Type: Gram Panchayat

Population (2011)
  - Total: 2,529

Languages
  - Official: Kannada
- Time zone: UTC+5:30 (IST)
- ISO 3166 code: IN-KA
- Vehicle registration: KA-47
- Website: karnataka.gov.in

Hospattan officially known as Hosapatna is a village near the bank of the river Sharavati in Honnavar taluk in the Uttara Kannada district of Karnataka state of India. Once the capital of Nawayath Sultanate and the former settlement of Nawayath community.

== History ==
In 1342, it was visited by the Moroccan traveller Ibn Battuta, where he spoke about their social, economic, religious, cultural, and administrative factors. He describes the Sultan Jamaluddin as one of the best and most powerful rulers. According to Victor D'Souza, this location is strewn with debris, featuring piles of stones in multiple areas, along with the remnants of a mosque foundation that includes a minaret approximately 20 feet tall, characterized by a rounded design and internal stairs. Leading to the mosque area, there are spacious passages. The several heaps of rubble collected at various places would testify to the existence of a large number of houses.

In 1427, Timmanna-Odeya, the governor of the Vijayanagar Empire, was operating from his headquarters in Honnavar. Following a dispute with the Hanjamana (corrupted word of 'Anjuman' also known as 'Jamaat') chief, who faced harassment from the governor, Ummaramarakala (Umar Marakkar), the Hanjamana chief sought help from Sangiraya Odeya of Nagire after relocating to Kasarkod. Meanwhile, Timmanna-Odeya launched a treacherous assault on Kasarkod and treated the women of the Hanjamana community harshly. They were saved by Kotishvaranayaka, the minister of Sangiraya Odeya who bravely fought against the governor. The Hanjamana (or Nawayath) community were transported to safety using ferries.

== Demographics ==
The village has a population of 2,529, of which 1,321 are males and 1,208 are females, as per the Population Census 2011. And has a higher literacy rate compared to Karnataka. In 2011, the literacy rate of Hospattan village was 86.24%, compared to 75.36% of Karnataka, the Male literacy stands at 92.46 % while female literacy rate was 79.41 %.
