= Mavinkurve, Bhatkal =

Mavinkurve
- Village
- Location in Karnataka, India Mavinkurve (India)
- Coordinates: 13°59′N 74°32′E
- Country: India
- State: Karnataka
- District: Uttara Kannada
- Taluk: Bhatkal

Government
  - Type: Gram Panchayat
  - Body: Mavinkurve Gram Panchayat

Area
  - Total: 25.11 ha (62.0 acres)

Population
  - Total: 1,364
  - Density: 5,432/km^{2} (14,070/sq mi)
- Time zone: UTC+5:30 (IST)
- PIN: 581320
- Village Code: 603828
- ISO 3166 code: IN-KA

Mavinkurve is a village in the coastal Karnataka in India, located in the Bhatkal taluk of Uttara Kannada district in Karnataka.

== Demographics ==
As per 2011 India census, Mavinkurve has a population of 1364 in which 679 are males and 685 are females. Schedule Caste (SC) constitutes 24.27% of total population in Mavinkurve village. There are currently no Schedule Tribe (ST) population.

== Communities, Languages, and Culture ==
Mavinkurve consists mainly of Hindus of many communities, including such as Kharvi, Mogera, Mogaveera, Namadhari Naiks or Poojari(Billavas), and Kunabis, as well as a few Christians and Muslims.

Languages spoken in Mavinkurve include Kannada Konkani, Urdu, and Nawayathi. Residents celebrate the holidays of Ganesh Chathurthi, Deepavali, Navarathri, Sharadothsava, Holi, Ramzan, Bakrid, and Christmas.
