= Bailur =

- village
- Location in Karnataka, India Bailur (India)
- Coordinates: 14°7′N 74°29′E
- Country: India
- State: Karnataka
- District: Uttara Kannada
- Taluk: Bhatkal

Government
  - Type: Panchayat raj

Population (2001)
  - Total: 5,940

Languages
  - Official: Kannada
- Time zone: UTC+5:30 (IST)
- ISO 3166 code: IN-KA

Bailur is a village in the southern state of Karnataka, India, located in the Bhatkal taluk of Uttara Kannada district in Karnataka.

== Demographics ==
As of 2001 India census, Bailur had a population of 5940 with 2898 males and 3042 females. St.Francis Xavier Church is main attraction of Bailur.

== See also ==
- Uttara Kannada
- Mangalore
- Districts of Karnataka
