= Shivanand Naik =

Indian politician

Personal details
- Born: 1962 (age 63–64) Manki, Honnavar
- Occupation: Ex Member of the Legislative Assembly (India), Ex Minister for small scale Industries; Ex Chairman of KSDL

Shivanand Naik was born in Manki, Honnavar Taluk on 6 December 1962. He was elected as the MLA two times from Bhatkal Constituency as part of the BJP. He became the Minister for Small Scale Industries in 2006. He was also the Chairman of Karnataka Soaps and Detergents Limited (KSDL).

Shivanand Naik joined KJP in 2013 and joined JDS to contest an MP election from Uttara Kannada in 2014. Later, he withdrew his nomination papers and joined BJP.
