= Basavaraj Durga Island =

Island in Karnataka, India

Coordinates: 14.3138°N 74.4022°E

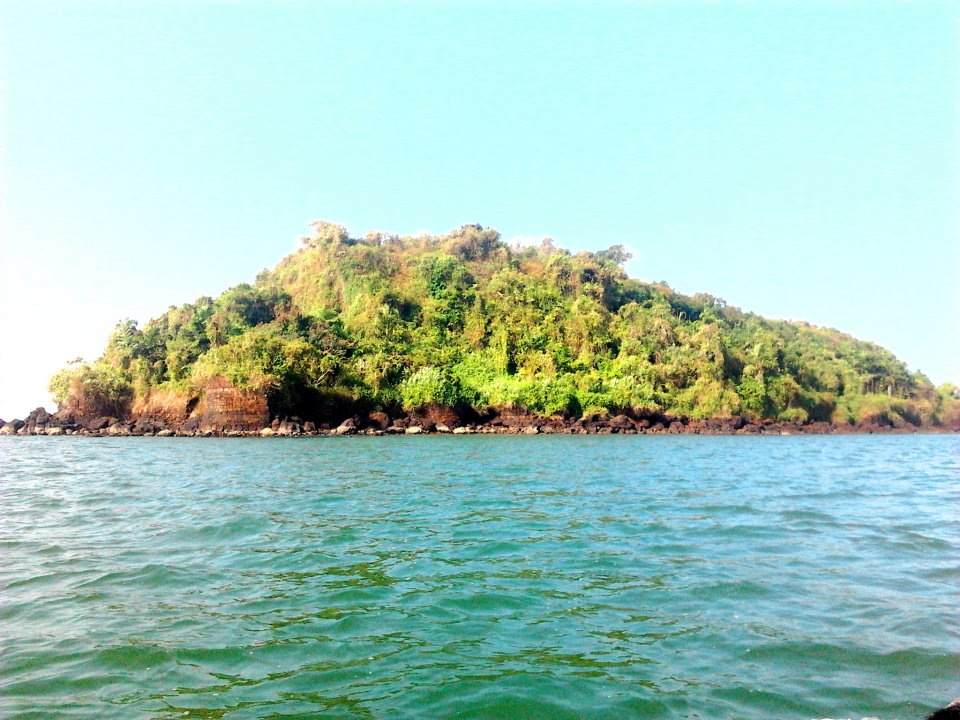
View of south east part of the island from 100m distance

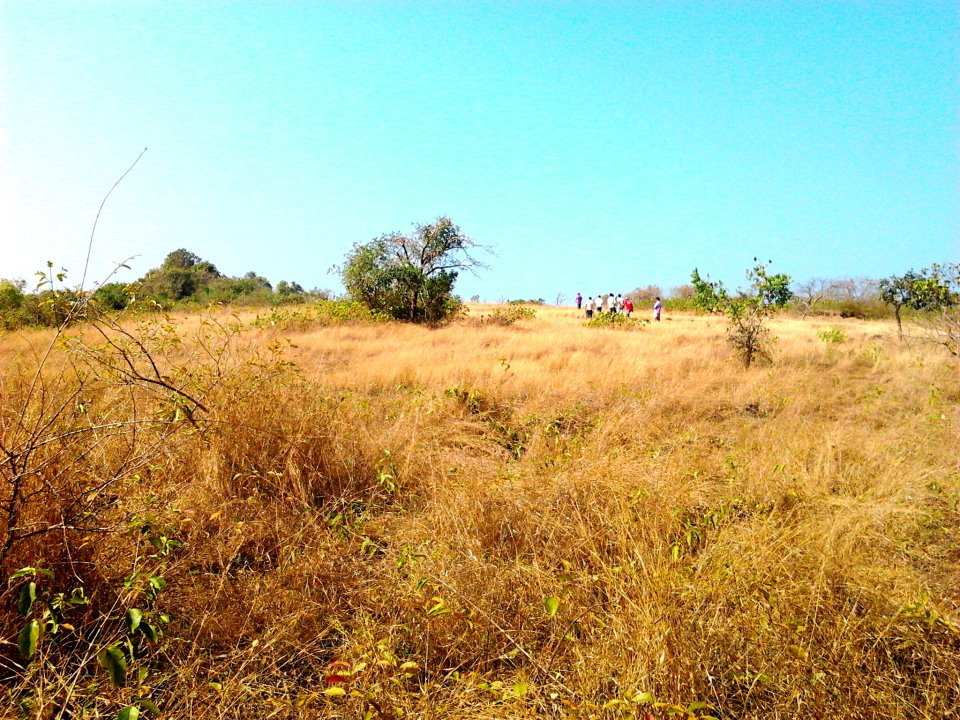
The top of the island is flat and covered with dry grass

Basavaraj Durga Island is an island in the Arabian Sea near Honnavar. It is part of Honnavar Taluk in Karnataka State of India.

== Geography ==
The island has a total area of 19 hectares and an elevation of 45 to 50m. There are a number of fresh water wells. The island can be reached by boat, fishing trawlers or canoe (although canoe is not recommended for visitors) by a sail upstream on river sharavati. The island lies 4km from Honnavar, 3km from Sharavati Bay and just 1km from Mavinakurve village (an island which also has a beach), and 700 meters from Taribagilu village, another beach island. The trip takes about 30 to 45 Minutes from Honnavar and 5 to 10 Minutes from Taribagilu village by sail.

The landing place is at the southeastern part of the island, where there is an architectural entrance made by stones which was also the entrance to fort. The top of the island is a plateau covered with dry grass and trees that can be seen only at the sloping part of the island.

== Temple ==
This island has a Hindu temple on its top surface constructed by the ruler between the 16th and 17th centuries. Now people, especially fishermen and boat owners, visit this temple with their families on Makarasankranti day (a Hindu festival) on 14 January to give pooja to Nagadevate (a Hindu god) to protect and guide them from natures forces while working on the sea.

== Basavaraj Durga Fort ==
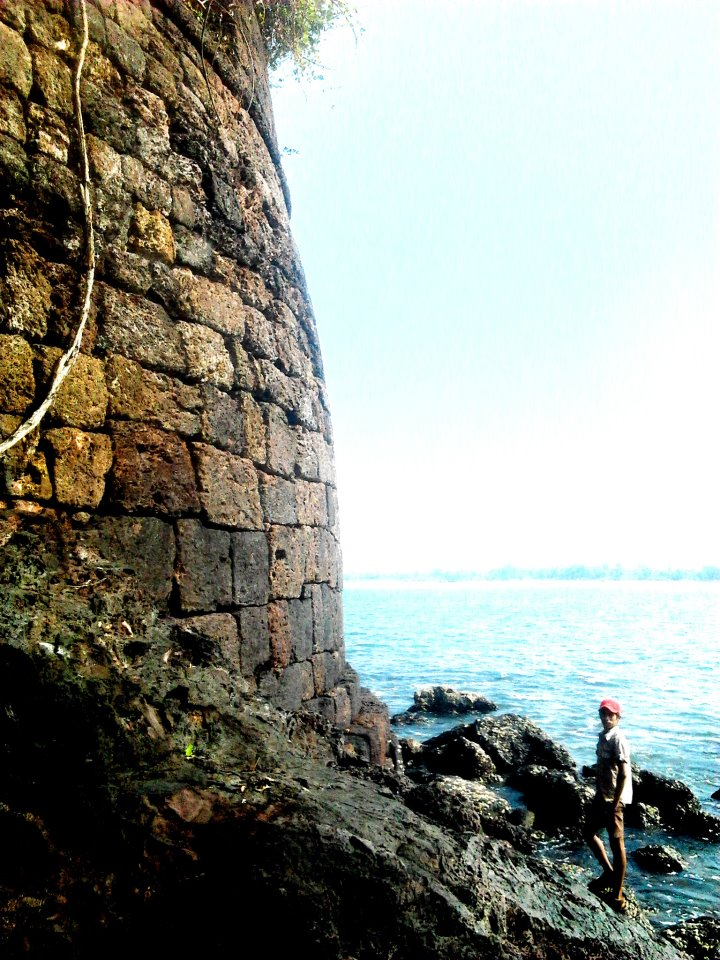
Fort wall in a curve shape

Basavaraj Durga Fort was constructed during Vijayanagar rule in 1590. Keladi ruler Shivappa Nayaka captured it and named it Basavaraj Durga in memory of Keladi prince Basavaraj. The fort is surrounded by a strong fortification raised by gigantic laterite blocks also this fort has eight ruined mounted guns.

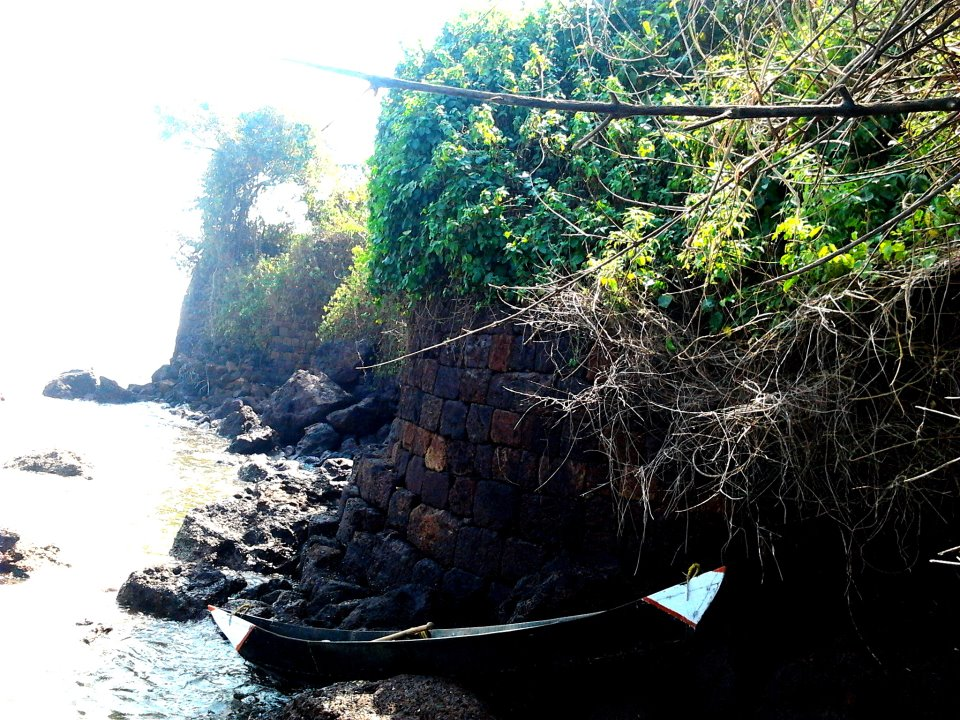
Island surrounded by a wall made by gigantic blocks
