= Jamia Islamia Bhatkal =

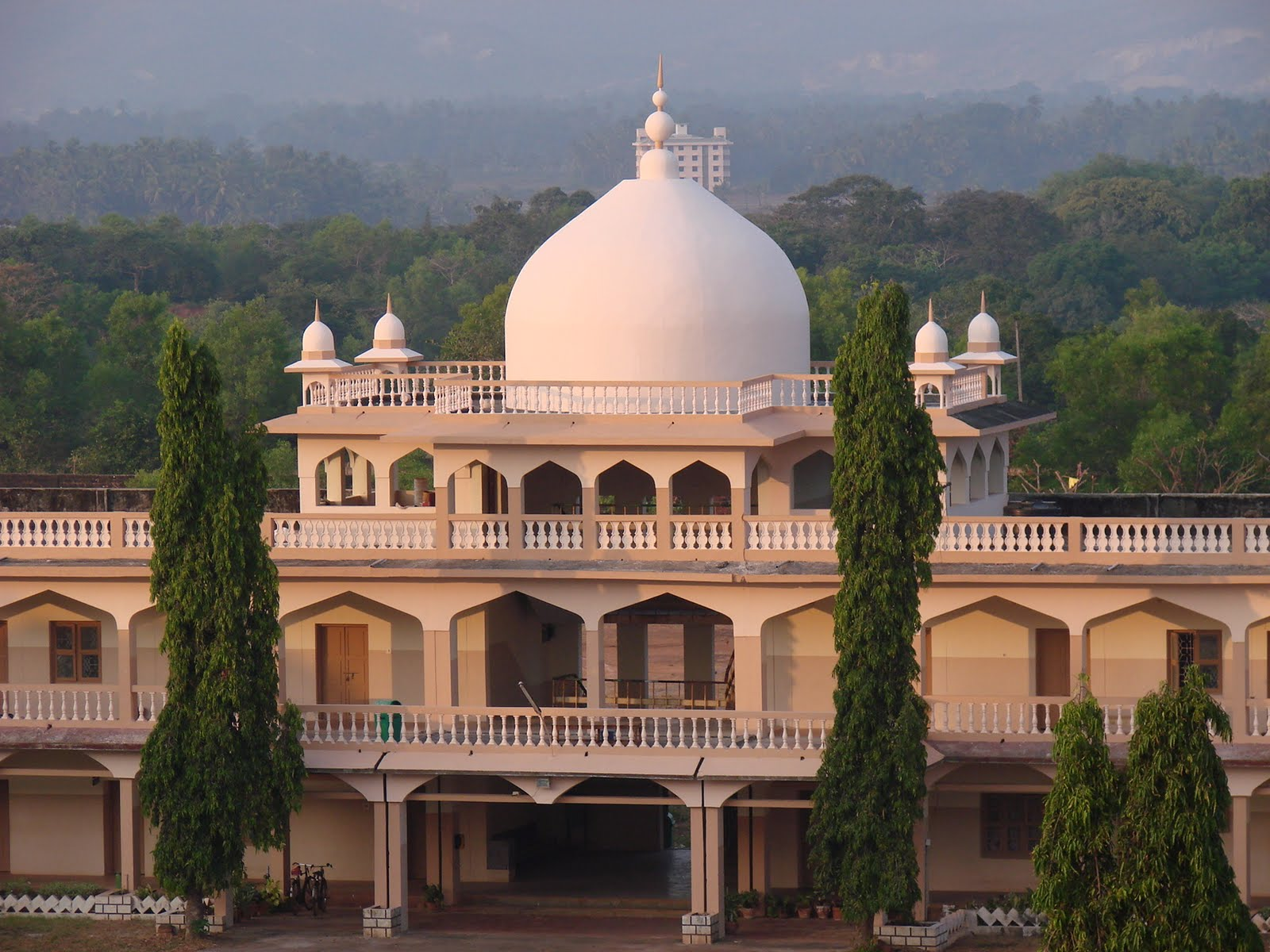
- Type: Islamic seminary
- Established: 1962
- Affiliations: Darul-uloom Nadwatul Ulama
- President: Abdul Aleem Qasmi
- Principal: Maqbool Kobatte Nadwi
- Location: Bhatkal, Karnataka, India
- Campus: Urban
- Website: jamiabhatkal.com

Jamia Islamia Bhatkal is an Islamic seminary of Islamic learning located in Bhatkal, Karnataka, India. It was established in 1962 and celebrated its 50th anniversary in 2012.

Jamia was a venue for a conference of All India Muslim Personal Law Board held in 2009 and the Muslim World League's educational convention in 2012.

== Foundation ==
When the British government established an English school in the town in 1871, it received backlash from locals. In order to educate Muslims in Bhatkal about Islam, Jamia Islamia was founded. In 1927, Chief Qazi Khalifa Jamaat Muslimeen Bhatkal Mohammed Ismail Akrami started the Nazira Quran and the fiqh at his residence. In 1950, Dr. Ali Malpa started his efforts to establish an Islamic seminary, and guidance was taken from various Islamic scholars like Abdul Majid Daryabadi, Abdul Bari Nadwi Lucknowi, Sayyid Sulaiman Nadwi, Shah WasiUllah Fatehpuri, Muhammad Tayyib Qasmi, etc. A small madrasa was established in the house of Sada Mohammad Jifri in 1961. A year later, G.M. Abdul Qadir Jaan donated 2 acres of land, and on August 20, 1962, famous scholar Arshad Ahmed Qasimi from darul Uloom Deoband officially opened Jamia Islamia Bhatkal. Abdul Hameed Nadwi was named as the first principal.

== Library ==
The library inside the campus is certified by UGC as a research-level facility for Islamic, philosophy and Arabic studies. This library has a collection of 40000 books in Arabic and English, about philosophy, jurisprudence, religion, literature, Islamic law.

== Publications ==
- Armaghan-e-Hijaz: Urdu Magazine.
- Az-Zahra: Arabic Magazine.

== See also ==
- Darul Uloom Nadwatul Ulama
- Darul Uloom Deoband
- Nawayath
