= Manki, Honnavar =

Manki, Honnavar Manki Bhansali
- Town
- Location in Karnataka, India Manki, Honnavar (India)
- Coordinates: 14.10575°N 74.50174°E
- Country: India
- State: Karnataka
- District: Uttara Kannada
- Taluk: Honnavar

Government
  - Type: Town Panchayat
  - Body: Manki Town Panchayat

Area
  - Total: 25 km^{2} (9.7 sq mi)
- Elevation: 3 m (9.8 ft)

Population (2011)
  - Total: 19,064
  - Density: 760/km^{2} (2,000/sq mi)

Languages
  - Official: Kannada
  - Other Languages: Konkani, Nawayathi Nakhuda
- Time zone: UTC+5:30 (IST)
- PIN: 581 348
- Telephone code: 08387
- Vehicle registration: KA-47
- Website: www.mankitown.mrc.gov.in

Manki or Mankipura is a town in Honnavar Taluk, Uttara Kannada district of Karnataka, India. It is located on the shore of the Arabian Sea between Goa and Mangalore, about 100 km from Karwar. It lies on NH-66, which runs between Mumbai and Mangalore.

Manki was formerly a village and was upgraded to town status in 2021. It is surrounded by forest and hills. Communities living in the town include Ramakshatriyas (Sherugar), Daivajna Brahmin, Gauda Saraswat Brahmin, Namadhari, Nakhuda, Nawayath and Christian groups.

== History ==
Manki was part of the Hoysala Empire from 1291 until 1343. After the decline of the Hoysalas, the area passed to the Vijayanagara Empire, and later came under the Saluva rulers of Hadwalli, a town on the state highway leading to Jog Falls.

Local tradition holds that Arab traders reached Manki by sea and introduced Islam to the area, and that the first mosque in Manki was built in the Nakhuda Mohalla.

== Geography ==
Manki lies on the coast of the Arabian Sea at 14.10575°N 74.50174°E. It has an average elevation of 3 metres (9.8 ft).

== Languages ==
Kannada is the official language. Konkani and Nawayathi are also widely spoken. Many Nawayaths work abroad, particularly in Saudi Arabia and the United Arab Emirates, and Arabic is spoken by some residents.

== Demographics ==
According to the 2011 Census of India, Manki had a population of 19,064, of which 9,501 were male and 9,563 were female, living in 4,001 households. Children aged 0–6 numbered 2,039, and the literacy rate was 81.66 per cent.

Residents of Manki are known as Mankivasi. Since the early 1940s, members of the Nakhuda, Nawayath and Christian communities have migrated to countries in the Middle East, especially Bahrain, Dubai, Qatar and Saudi Arabia.

== Education ==
Educational institutions in Manki include:

- Al-Hilal English Medium School and Pre-University College
- Madarasa Rahmaniya Manki
- Assisi Primary School Manki
- Goal International School Manki
- Government Pre-University College Manki
- Government Urdu High School Manki
- Government High School Banasale
- Government First Grade College Manki
- Government Urdu Primary School No. 2 Manki

Students also travel daily to schools and colleges in Honnavar and Bhatkal.

== Culture and religion ==
=== Shree Laxmi Venkatesh Math ===
The sanctum idol of Lord Shree Laxmi Venkatesh at Banasale Math in Manki, Honnavar.

Shree Laxmi Venkatesh Math, located in the Banasale locality (historically recorded as Manikyapura) of Manki, is a religious center and an official branch (shakha) of Shree Samsthan Gokarn Partagali Jeevottam Math.

Originally established as a family-managed shrine by local archakas, the temple, along with its associated properties, was formally handed over to the Partagali Math samsthan on 11 February 1946 (Shaka 1867, Magha Shukla Dashami) under the pontificate of H.H. Shrimad Dwarakanatha Teertha Swamiji.

The math enshrines Lord Laxmi Venkatesha and serves as the socio-religious hub for the local Gaud Saraswat Brahmin (GSB) community. It hosts pontifical visits (parvesha and vastavya) of the Partagali peethadhipatis, conducts daily teertha prasada, and serves as a venue for annual observances such as Saptaha, Vana Bhojana, Kartika Deepotsava, Ananta Chaturdashi , Vardhanti Utsava and devotional sessions by the local Shri Laxmi Venkatesh Bhajana Mandali.

=== Molageri Temple ===
The Molageri Temple, near Manki Mavinakatta, is dedicated to the Parivara Devaru and to the deity Huligirthi. Daily worship at the temple is carried out by members of the Gowda family, and a member of the local Mahale family traditionally garlands the officiating priest before rituals begin.

During the annual Sankranti festival, the priest takes part in a night-time ceremony wearing sacred bells (gejje) and enters a state of ritual possession (darshan). The observance ends with a communal meal (annasantarpana).
