= R. N. Naik =

Indian politician

R.N. Naik was an Indian politician. Graduated in LAW and Bachelor of science. He was born in Honnavar. He was elected as the MLA from Bhatkal Constituency For 15 years for the Indian National Congress three times in 1983, 1985 and 1989. He was the minister for the Kannada and Culture.
