= Chikkankod =

- Village
- Chikkankod
- Location in Karnataka, India
- Coordinates: 14.2853348°N 74.5210378°E
- Country: India
- State: Karnataka
- District: Uttara Kannada district

Population (2011)
  - Total: 1,866

Languages
  - Official: Kannada
- Time zone: UTC+5:30 (IST)
- PIN: 581361

Chikkankod is a village located in Honavar Tehsil of Uttara Kannada district in Karnataka, India. It is situated 13 km away from the sub-district headquarters Honnavar and 103 km away from the district headquarters Karwar. As of 2009, Chikkankod is also a gram panchayat.

== Nearest places ==
Chikkankod village is 12 kilometres away from Honnavar town. The total geographical area of Chikkankod is 273.6 hectares. Chikkankod has a total population of 1,856 people (as of 2011). There are about 426 houses in Chikkankod.
