= Kaikini =

- village
- Country: India
- State: Karnataka
- District: Uttara Kannada
- Talukas: Bhatkal

Population (2001)
  - Total: 9,293

Languages
  - Official: Kannada
- Time zone: UTC+5:30 (IST)

Kaikini is a village in the southern state of Karnataka, India. It is located in the Bhatkal taluk of Uttara Kannada district in Karnataka. One of the ancient temple, Shree Shivamuneeshwara Shantadurga Temple, established in the year 1752, is situated in Kaikini. Every year the Navratri festival is celebrated there.

== Demographics ==
As of 2001 India census, Kaikini had a population of 9293 with 4518 males and 4775 females.

== See also ==
- Uttara Kannada
- Mangalore
- Districts of Karnataka
