= Bhatkal Assembly constituency =

Legislative Assembly constituency in Karnataka State, India

Coordinates: 14°N 74.54°E

Bhatkal
- Constituency No. 79 for the Karnataka Legislative Assembly

Constituency details
- Country: India
- Region: South India
- State: Karnataka
- District: Uttara Kannada
- Lok Sabha constituency: Uttara Kannada
- Established: 1966
- Total electors: 222,794
- Reservation: None

Member of Legislative Assembly
- 16th Karnataka Legislative Assembly
- Incumbent M. S. Vaidya
- Party: Indian National Congress
- Elected year: 2023
- Preceded by: Sunil Biliya Naik

Bhatkal Assembly constituency is one of the 224 Legislative Assembly constituencies of Karnataka in India. It is part of Uttara Kannada district.

The constituency is infamous for Communal tensions due to notable presence of Hindutva groups and Islamic fundamentalism.

In April 10, 1996 a sitting Member of the Legislative Assembly from this constituency was assassinated by gunfire.

== Electorate ==
The constituency has around 2.15 lakhs votes. Nearly 1.6 lakh voters i.e. more than 70% of vote base are Hindus, followed by Muslims at nearly 55,000 who are 25.4% and Christians at 7300 forming 3.4% of the electorate. Among Hindu vote base the single major group is Namdharis constituting about 70,000 votes. The Scheduled Castes and Scheduled Tribes forms 10.1% of the electorate with nearly 22,000 votes.

== Members of the Legislative Assembly ==
Election	Member	Party
1967	J. M. Manjanath	Praja Socialist Party
1972	Siddiq Mohamed Yahya Bin Umer	Indian National Congress
1978	Siddiq Mohamed Yahya Bin Umer	Indian National Congress
1983	Rama Narayan Naik	Janata Party
1985	Rama Narayan Naik	Janata Party
1989	Rama Narayan Naik	Indian National Congress
1994	Dr. U. Chittaranjan	Bharatiya Janata Party
1996 By-election	Shivanand Naik	Bharatiya Janata Party
1999	J. D. Naik	Indian National Congress
2004	Shivanand Naik	Bharatiya Janata Party
2008	J. D. Naik	Indian National Congress
2013	Mankala Vaidya	Independent politician
2018	Sunil Biliya Naik	Bharatiya Janata Party
2023	Mankala Vaidya	Indian National Congress

== Election results ==
=== Assembly Election 2023 ===
2023 Karnataka Legislative Assembly election : Bhatkal
Party	Candidate	Votes	%	±%
INC	Mankala Vaidya	100,442	57.45%	▲10.89
BJP	Sunil Biliya Naik	67,771	38.76%	▼11.38
JD(S)	Nagendra Naik	1,502	0.86%	New
NOTA	None of the above	1,223	0.70%	▼0.50
Margin of victory		32,671	18.69%	▲15.12
Turnout		175,090	78.59%	▲1.24
Total valid votes		174,848		
Registered electors		222,794		▲3.75
INC gain from BJP		Swing	▲7.31	

=== Assembly Election 2018 ===
2018 Karnataka Legislative Assembly election : Bhatkal
Party	Candidate	Votes	%	±%
BJP	Sunil Biliya Naik	83,172	50.14%	▲38.87
INC	Mankal Vaidya	77,242	46.56%	▲29.97
NOTA	None of the above	1,986	1.20%	New
AIMEP	Gafoor Sab	1,446	0.87%	New
Margin of victory		5,930	3.57%	▼3.96
Turnout		166,100	77.35%	▲6.38
Total valid votes		165,886		
Registered electors		214,750		▲13.23
BJP gain from Independent		Swing	▲21.69	

=== Assembly Election 2013 ===
2013 Karnataka Legislative Assembly election : Bhatkal
Party	Candidate	Votes	%	±%
Independent	Mankala Vaidya	37,319	28.45%	New
JD(S)	Enayathullah Shabandri	27,435	20.91%	▲17.07
KJP	Shivanand Naik	26,657	20.32%	New
INC	J. D. Naik	21,766	16.59%	▼28.13
BJP	Govinda Jattappa Naik	14,791	11.27%	▼22.37
Independent	Bhushan Naik	2,571	1.96%	New
Independent	Mulla Nadeem Ahmed	1,285	0.98%	New
Independent	Kumar Nagappa Heble	1,047	0.80%	New
BSP	Hosad Santosh Hanumant Prabhu	902	0.69%	▼0.62
Margin of victory		9,884	7.53%	▼3.56
Turnout		134,596	70.97%	▲7.49
Total valid votes		131,191		
Registered electors		189,664		▲9.66
Independent gain from INC		Swing	▼16.27	

=== Assembly Election 2008 ===
2008 Karnataka Legislative Assembly election : Bhatkal
Party	Candidate	Votes	%	±%
INC	J. D. Naik	49,079	44.72%	▲4.02
BJP	Naik Shivananda Narayana	36,913	33.64%	▼11.07
SP	Yashodhara Ganapa Naik	12,538	11.43%	New
JD(S)	Naik Parameshwar Tippayya	4,211	3.84%	▼5.14
Independent	Bhushan Naik	2,946	2.68%	New
Independent	S. M. Zakriya	1,437	1.31%	New
BSP	Santosha Hanumantha Prabhu	1,437	1.31%	New
Rashtriya Hindustan Sena Karnataka	Shetty Girish Lokeshwar	1,179	1.07%	New
Margin of victory		12,166	11.09%	▲7.08
Turnout		109,792	63.48%	▼1.14
Total valid votes		109,740		
Registered electors		172,949		▲7.52
INC gain from BJP		Swing	▲0.01	

=== Assembly Election 2004 ===
2004 Karnataka Legislative Assembly election : Bhatkal
Party	Candidate	Votes	%	±%
BJP	Shivanand Naik	46,471	44.71%	▲0.42
INC	J. D. Naik	42,301	40.70%	▼6.32
JD(S)	Yashodhar Naik	9,333	8.98%	▲0.29
JP	Prof Tanaveer Asif Zerdi	2,774	2.67%	New
Independent	Hegde Shripad Narayan	2,045	1.97%	New
Independent	Bhushan K. R	1,016	0.98%	New
Margin of victory		4,170	4.01%	▲1.28
Turnout		103,940	64.62%	▼0.21
Total valid votes		103,940		
Registered electors		160,852		▲12.09
BJP gain from INC		Swing	▼2.31	

=== Assembly Election 1999 ===
1999 Karnataka Legislative Assembly election : Bhatkal
Party	Candidate	Votes	%	±%
INC	J. D. Naik	42,004	47.02%	▲39.82
BJP	Shivanand Naik	39,567	44.29%	▼12.01
JD(S)	Rama Narayan Naik	7,763	8.69%	New
Margin of victory		2,437	2.73%	▼18.53
Turnout		93,043	64.83%	▲4.40
Total valid votes		89,334		
Rejected ballots		3,698	3.97%	▲1.87
Registered electors		143,508		▲3.54
INC gain from BJP		Swing	▼9.28	

=== Assembly By-election 1996 ===
1996 Karnataka Legislative Assembly by-election : Bhatkal
Party	Candidate	Votes	%	±%
BJP	Shivanand Naik	46,145	56.30%	▲5.75
JD	Naik Damodar Gardikar	28,718	35.04%	▲22.94
INC	M. S. Naik	5,904	7.20%	▼18.39
Independent	I. M. Rizwan	1,202	1.47%	New
Margin of victory		17,427	21.26%	▼3.71
Turnout		83,754	60.43%	▼8.92
Total valid votes		81,969		
Rejected ballots		1,762	2.10%	▲0.08
Registered electors		138,606		▲5.09
BJP hold		Swing	▲5.75	

=== Assembly Election 1994 ===
1994 Karnataka Legislative Assembly election : Bhatkal
Party	Candidate	Votes	%	±%
BJP	Dr. U. Chittaranjan	45,308	50.55%	▲44.57
INC	Naik Laxmi Manjappa	22,931	25.59%	▼13.84
JD	Gouda Shambu Narayan	10,843	12.10%	▼24.54
INC	Laxman. S. Naik	9,600	10.71%	New
SP	Lalita. G. Hegde	941	1.05%	New
Margin of victory		22,377	24.97%	▲22.17
Turnout		91,470	69.35%	▲5.80
Total valid votes		89,623		
Rejected ballots		1,846	2.02%	▼5.22
Registered electors		131,889		▲3.88
BJP gain from INC		Swing	▲11.12	

=== Assembly Election 1989 ===
1989 Karnataka Legislative Assembly election : Bhatkal
Party	Candidate	Votes	%	±%
INC	Rama Narayan Naik	29,513	39.43%	▲15.13
JD	Gardikar Damodar Narayan	27,421	36.64%	New
JP	Gouda Shambu Narayan	8,529	11.40%	New
Independent	Victor Rodrigues	4,508	6.02%	New
BJP	Gajanan Parameshwar Naik	4,473	5.98%	▼14.09
Margin of victory		2,092	2.80%	▼15.97
Turnout		80,680	63.55%	▲1.25
Total valid votes		74,840		
Rejected ballots		5,840	7.24%	▲5.10
Registered electors		126,957		▲35.39
INC gain from JP		Swing	▼3.64	

=== Assembly Election 1985 ===
1985 Karnataka Legislative Assembly election : Bhatkal
Party	Candidate	Votes	%	±%
JP	Rama Narayan Naik	24,621	43.07%	▼8.98
INC	Gouda Shambu Narayan	13,890	24.30%	▼23.65
BJP	Madhav Rama Naik	11,471	20.07%	New
Independent	Uppur Chitttranjan	5,815	10.17%	New
Independent	Devadiga Annappa Bhaira	1,369	2.39%	New
Margin of victory		10,731	18.77%	▲14.67
Turnout		58,418	62.30%	▼7.30
Total valid votes		57,166		
Rejected ballots		1,252	2.14%	▼1.08
Registered electors		93,768		▲9.15
JP hold		Swing	▼8.98	

=== Assembly Election 1983 ===
1983 Karnataka Legislative Assembly election : Bhatkal
Party	Candidate	Votes	%	±%
JP	Rama Narayan Naik	30,119	52.05%	▲11.67
INC	S. M. Yahya Siddika Umar	27,746	47.95%	▲42.72
Margin of victory		2,373	4.10%	▼9.91
Turnout		59,790	69.60%	▼4.86
Total valid votes		57,865		
Rejected ballots		1,925	3.22%	▲0.42
Registered electors		85,909		▲9.79
JP gain from INC(I)		Swing	▼2.34	

=== Assembly Election 1978 ===
1978 Karnataka Legislative Assembly election : Bhatkal
Party	Candidate	Votes	%	±%
INC(I)	Siddiq Mohamed Yahya Bin Umer	30,800	54.39%	New
JP	Dr. U. Chittaranjan	22,867	40.38%	New
INC	Naik Vasantrao Ganap	2,961	5.23%	▼50.71
Margin of victory		7,933	14.01%	▼7.32
Turnout		58,258	74.46%	▲12.52
Total valid votes		56,628		
Rejected ballots		1,630	2.80%	▲2.80
Registered electors		78,245		▲15.19
INC(I) gain from INC		Swing	▼1.55	

=== Assembly Election 1972 ===
1972 Mysore State Legislative Assembly election : Bhatkal
Party	Candidate	Votes	%	±%
INC	S. M. Yahya Siddika Umar	22,751	55.94%	▲24.94
INC(O)	Madev Bin Rama Naik	14,074	34.60%	New
Independent	Lakkumane Rama Shivappa	2,686	6.60%	New
ABJS	Honnappa Devu Naik	1,162	2.86%	New
Margin of victory		8,677	21.33%	▼3.64
Turnout		42,074	61.94%	▲8.76
Total valid votes		40,673		
Registered electors		67,927		▲8.68
INC gain from PSP		Swing	▼0.03	

=== Assembly Election 1967 ===
1967 Mysore State Legislative Assembly election : Bhatkal
Party	Candidate	Votes	%	±%
PSP	J. M. Manjanath	16,655	55.97%	New
INC	H. R. Suraya	9,224	31.00%	New
SWA	H. A. H. A. Saheb	3,876	13.03%	New
Margin of victory		7,431	24.97%	
Turnout		33,241	53.18%	
Total valid votes		29,755		
Registered electors		62,501		
PSP win (new seat)				

== See also ==
- List of constituencies of the Karnataka Legislative Assembly
- Uttara Kannada district
