= Tonse =

Tonse Thonse
- Village
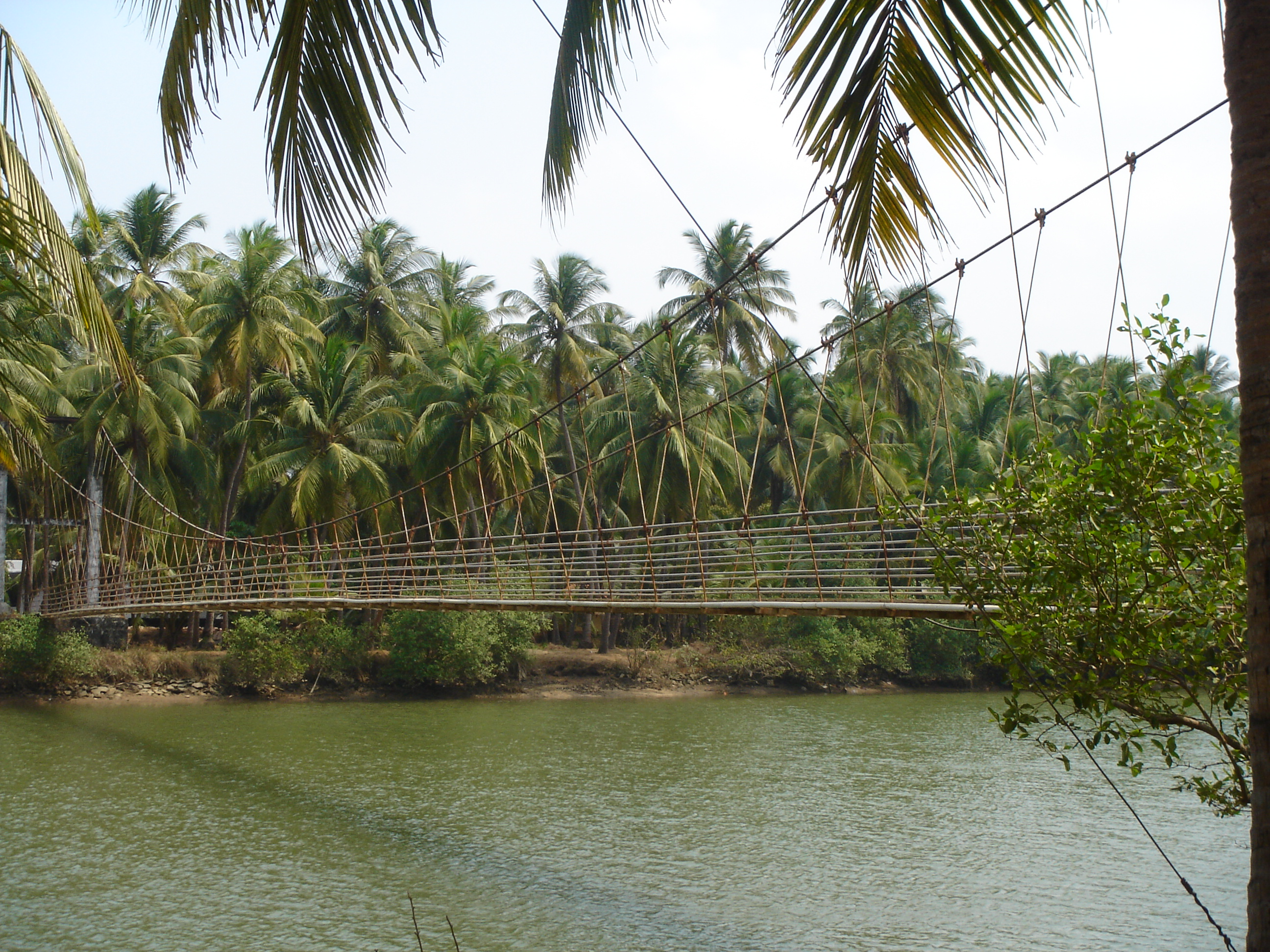
- Hanging Bridge at Tonse

- Location in Karnataka, India Tonse (India)
- Coordinates: 13.40°N 74.72°E
- Country: India
- State: Karnataka
- District: Udupi

Population (2011)
  - Total: 16,000

Languages
  - Official: Kannada
  - Regional: Tulu, Kannada, Konkani, Urdu, Nawayathi
- Time zone: UTC+5:30 (IST)
- PIN: 576114, 576115
- Telephone code: 0820
- Vehicle registration: KA-20

Tonse is a combined village, which includes Tonse West and Tonse East situated about 8 kilometres (5.0 mi) from Udupi on the western coast of South India, between the Arabian Sea and Western Ghats. Tonse village is about 68 kilometres (42 mi) to the north of Mangalore.

== Location ==
Tonse is bounded on its western side the Arabian Sea while on the eastern side the Suvarna river runs, creating a number of islands in its delta before it finally merges with the sea at Kodibengre.

== Tourism ==
Towards the northern tip of Tonse there is Kodi Bengre where Suvarna river flows into Arabian Sea. This creates a delta with numerous islands known as Kuduru. This is popularly known as "Delta Beach". Bengre is a thin strip of land almost 4 km long and holds back the sea on the west and the river on the east. At some stretches this strip in barely 50 metres wide.

In the delta of Suvarna, a group of about a dozen islands, covered with coconut palms and surrounded by clear blue waters.. Recently many House Boats are seen in the backwaters of Hoode.

A hanging bridge, which attracts visitors, connects one of the better-known islands, Thimmankudru to the mainland. The Hanging Bridge was constructed by 2 Karnataka Engineer NCC and the bridge was named as Deepak in memory of a late NCC Cadet. The complete material for construction of this bridge was made available by local people from their own private funds, the bridge was designed by Officer Commanding 2 Kar Engg NCC and was constructed by NCC Cadets of REC Surathkal (NIIT), Manipal Institute of Technology and NITTE College of Engineering in the Year 1991. Total time taken to construct the Bridge was about twelve days. The piers had been constructed by local villagers prior to this. Now a new bridge is being constructed to link the island by a motorable road.

Three miles off the seacoast are the St. Mary’s Islands, a tourist spot, (locally known as ‘Tonse-Par’ meaning, ‘beyond Tonse’), reachable from the port town of Malpe, by powerboat or country craft.

== People and occupation ==
There are many from this village employed abroad. The western part of Tonse has a number of educational institutions providing literacy and career opportunities, as a result of which people from this rural place are employed in all the parts of the world. Agriculture, fishing, lime-shell mining and coir industry are the main source of livelihood of people in this region. Rice is the staple food of the population, whereas coconut is the commercial crop.

== Geography ==
There are many islands scattered in the backwaters. Prominent among them being Timman-Kudru and Pintere-Kudru.

== Transport ==
Kemmannu and Kallianpur are the two main towns of the village and the National Highway 66 (17) passes through Kallianpur. On the west coast of the village, running along the seashore is a road, which links Hoode-Ben gre in the north to Malpe port in the south. Udupi-Manipal is the commercial and educa tional hub for the people of Tonse.

== Language ==
Tulu is the most widely spoken language in Tonse. Other significant languages include language Konkani, Kannada, Nawayath and Urdu.

== Religion ==
Tonse is a multireligious place where people of different communities have lived here for centuries in harmony. Though primarily followers of Hinduism, there are sizable followers of Christianity and of Islam. Tonse has 6 temples, 3 churches and 6 mosques.

== Governance ==
Tonse has a village panchayat based at Kallianpur for Tonse East and Kemmannu for Tonse West.

== Educational Institutions ==
- Milagres College, Kallianpur
- Dr. T M A Pai High School, Kallianpur
- Saint Philomina Higher Primary School, Kemmannu
- Tonse Kandige Higher Primary School, Kemmannu
- Government Junior College, Kemmannu
- Government Urdu School, Hoode
- Darussalam Education Society, Hoode
- Salihath English Medium School, Hoode
- Salihath Girls Pre-University, Hoode
- Salihath Women's First Grade College, Hoode
- Salihath Women's Arabic College, Hoode

== Health Care ==
- Goratti Hospital, Kallianpur.
- Thonse Health Centre.
- Government Hospital

== See also ==
- Kallianpur
- Mangalore
- Udupi district
