= Ternamakki =

- Village
- Country: India
- Region: South India
- State: Karnataka
- District: Uttara Kannada

Languages
  - Official: Kannada
- Time zone: UTC+5:30
- PIN: 581-421
- Telephone code: (91)08385
- Vehicle registration: KA-47
- Nearest city: Bhatkal, Honavar

Ternamakki is a village in Bhatkal Taluk Karnataka, India. The PIN code of Ternamakki is 581421. All the postal transactions with this PIN code reach the post office of the region. Ternamakki is located 155 km north of the chief port city Mangalore.
