= Honnavar Assembly constituency =

Former Assembly constituency in Mysore state, India

Coordinates: 14.282°N 74.443°E

Honnavar
- Former constituency for the State Legislative Assembly

Constituency details
- Country: India
- State: Mysore State
- Division: Belagavi
- District: Uttara Kannada
- Lok Sabha constituency: Uttara Kannada
- Established: 1951
- Abolished: 1967
- Reservation: None

Honnavar Assembly constituency was one of the Karnataka Legislative Assembly or Vidhan Sabha constituencies in Karnataka. It was part of Uttara Kannada Lok Sabha constituency.

== Members of the Legislative Assembly ==
Election	Member	Party
1952	Kamat Ramkrishna Narsinh	Indian National Congress
1957	Shamsuddin Bin Hussain Saheb Jukaku	Indian National Congress
1962	Shamsuddin Bin Hussain Saheb Jukaku	Indian National Congress
1963* (Note: By election needed due to the death of Shamsuddin Bin Hussain Saheb Jukaku [26 March 1964])	R. Hegde	Independent politician

== Election results ==
=== Assembly By-election 1964 ===
1963 Mysore State Legislative Assembly by-election : Honawar
Party	Candidate	Votes	%	±%
Independent	R. Hegde	12,940	60.01%	New
PSP	S. V. Naik	8,624	39.99%	▲5.28
Margin of victory		4,316	20.01%	▼3.75
Total valid votes		21,564		
Independent gain from INC		Swing	▲1.54	

=== Assembly Election 1962 ===
1962 Mysore State Legislative Assembly election : Honawar
Party	Candidate	Votes	%	±%
INC	Shamsuddin Bin Hussain Saheb Jukaku	18,506	58.47%	▲6.77
PSP	Honna Goydappa Naik	10,986	34.71%	▲1.83
CPI	Deepanna Manjayya Shetti	1,676	5.30%	New
Independent	Ganesh Mahabal Hegde	484	1.53%	New
Margin of victory		7,520	23.76%	▲4.95
Turnout		34,164	58.30%	▼0.73
Total valid votes		31,652		
Registered electors		58,598		▲10.57
INC hold		Swing	▲6.77	

=== Assembly Election 1957 ===
1957 Mysore State Legislative Assembly election : Honawar
Party	Candidate	Votes	%	±%
INC	Shamsuddin Bin Hussain Saheb Jukaku	16,172	51.70%	▲16.09
PSP	Naik Devendra Kalinga	10,287	32.88%	New
Independent	Kamat Vasudeo Rama	4,824	15.42%	New
Margin of victory		5,885	18.81%	▲11.88
Turnout		31,283	59.03%	▲3.66
Total valid votes		31,283		
Registered electors		52,998		▼4.03
INC hold		Swing	▲16.09	

=== Assembly Election 1952 ===
1952 Mysore State Legislative Assembly election : Honawar
Party	Candidate	Votes	%	±%
INC	Kamat Ramkrishna Narsinh	10,888	35.61%	New
Socialist Party (India)	Naik Devendra Kalinga	8,770	28.68%	New
Independent	Shamsuddin Bin Hussain Saheb Jukaku	8,659	28.32%	New
CPI	Singh. D. V	2,260	7.39%	New
Margin of victory		2,118	6.93%	
Turnout		30,577	55.37%	
Total valid votes		30,577		
Registered electors		55,225		
INC win (new seat)				
