= Shamsuddin Bin Hussain Saheb Jukaku =

Indian politician

J H Shamsuddin

Member of the Legislative Assembly
- In office 1957–1963
- Constituency: Honnavar

Deputy Minister for Finance
- In office 1957–1962
- Chief Minister: B. D. Jatti

Deputy Minister for Electricity
- In office 1962–1963
- Chief Minister: S. Nijalingappa

Personal details
- Born: 1914 Bhatkal
- Died: 1964-03-26
- Citizenship: India
- Party: Indian National Congress

J H Shamsuddin (Shamsuddin Bin Hussain Saheb Jukaku) was an Indian politician and a former Congress MLA in Mysore State who represented Honnavar from 1957 to 1963.

== Biography ==
Shamsuddin was born in Bhatkal, in Uttara Kannada district, in 1914 and did his schooling in Kumta. He did his Bachelor of Arts with Honors in Economics from Karnatak College in Dharwad, graduating in 1933. In 1935, he completed his LLB from Sykes College of Law in Kolhapur (under Bombay University) and became a practicing lawyer in Bhatkal.

His initial foray into politics began when he joined the Muslim League. As Secretary, he organized the Muslim Political Conference in 1936. During 1938 to 1941, Shamsuddin was a member of North Kanara D.L.B and in 1938 was the Secretary, North Kanara District Muslim Conference.

In 1946, he was elected to the Bombay Legislative Assembly. As an MLA, he was a member of the Village Industries Enquiry Committee, Port Development Committee, Bombay Provincial Prohibition Committee and Provincial Rural Development Board. In the town of Bhatkal, he was a Secretary of Anjuman Hami-e-Muslimeen, Bhatkal, a member of the District School Board and Development Board. The Cottage Hospital (now known as the Government General Hospital) was established with his support.

Shamsuddin was a President of the Municipality of Bhatkal from 1954 to 1958 and a member of the executive committee of the Congress Party. During his term as president, storm-water drainage systems were setup for the first time in Bhatkal. Electricity, street lights and telephone connections were introduced to Bhatkal during this time.

Following the States Reorganisation Act, 1956, Bhatkal became a part of the newly formed Mysore State (now Karnataka) and he was elected in 1957 to the Mysore Legislative Assembly from the Honnavar Assembly constituency. In the B. D. Jatti cabinet, he served as the Deputy Minister of Finance from 24 May 1958 till the dissolution of the assembly. After being re-elected in 1962, he was appointed as Deputy Minister of Electricity on 2 July 1962. He passed away on 26 March 1964.

Shamsuddin had 6 daughters and 4 sons. While serving in the Mysore Legislative Assembly, he resided in the Jayamahal neighborhood in Bangalore. His son Dr. Tayeb Jukaku is the father-in-law of the United States Senator-elect from Michigan Abdul El-Sayed.

The Shamsuddin Junction, a major junction in the center of Bhatkal town, is named after him. A building of the Bhatkal Muslim Jamat in Bangalore is named after him.
