= Heble =

- village
- Location in Karnataka, India Heble (India)
- Coordinates: 14°01′08″N 74°31′18″E
- Country: India
- State: Karnataka
- District: Uttara Kannada
- Taluk: Bhatkal

Government
  - Body: Gram pachayat

Population (2011)
  - Total: 11,584

Languages
  - Official: Kannada
- Time zone: UTC+5:30 (IST)
- PIN: 581320
- Village code: 603824

Heble is a village in the southern state of Karnataka, India. It is located in the Bhatkal taluk of Uttara Kannada district.

== Demographics ==
As of 2001 India census, Heble had a population of 9584 with 4682 males and 4902 females.

== See also ==
- Uttara Kannada
- Mangalore
- Districts of Karnataka
