= Venkatapur, Bhatkal, Karnataka =

Venkatapur
- town
- Location in Karnataka, India Venkatapur (India)
- Coordinates: 14.02°N 74.53°E
- Country: India
- State: Karnataka
- District: Uttara Kannada

Government
  - Type: Town Panchayat
  - Body: Jali Town Panchayat

Population (2001)
  - Total: 5,968

Languages
  - Official: Kannada
- Time zone: UTC+5:30 (IST)
- ISO 3166 code: IN-KA
- Vehicle registration: KA
- Website: karnataka.gov.in

Venkatapur was a census town in Bhatkal Taluk in the Uttara Kannada district of Karnataka. It was later merged into Jali town in 2015.

== Etymology ==
Venkatapur derives its name from Shree Lakshmi Venkatesh Temple.

== Demographics ==
As of 2001 India census, Venkatapur had a population of 5968. Males constitute 48% of the population and females 52%. Venkatapur has an average literacy rate of 73%, higher than the national average of 59.5%: male literacy is 76%, and female literacy is 70%. In Venkatapur, 15% of the population is under 6 years of age.

== See also ==
- Kundapur
- Mangalore
- Karwar
