= Konar (village) =

Village in Karnataka, India

Coordinates: 13°59′33″N 74°36′12″E

- Village
- Interactive map of Konar
- Country: India
- State: Karnataka
- District: Uttara Kannada
- Taluk: Bhatkal

Languages
  - Official: Kannada
- Time zone: UTC+5:30 (IST)

Konar is a village in Bhatkal on the western coast of India in the Uttara Kannada district of the state of Karnataka, India. It belongs to the Belegavi division.

== Location ==
Bhatkal is nearest town to Konar. Konar is situated 7 km away from the sub-district headquarter Bhatkal, and 152 km away from district headquarter Karwar. The village code of Konar is 603859.

== Population ==
According to the 2011 Census, Konar has a population of 782 people, including approximately 383 men ad 399 women. Konar has around 154 households and a literacy rate of 77.75%.

== See also ==
- Bhatkal
- Karwar
- Villages in Uttara Kannada district
