= Jagadhekamalla II =

Western Chalukya Emperor from 1138 to 1151

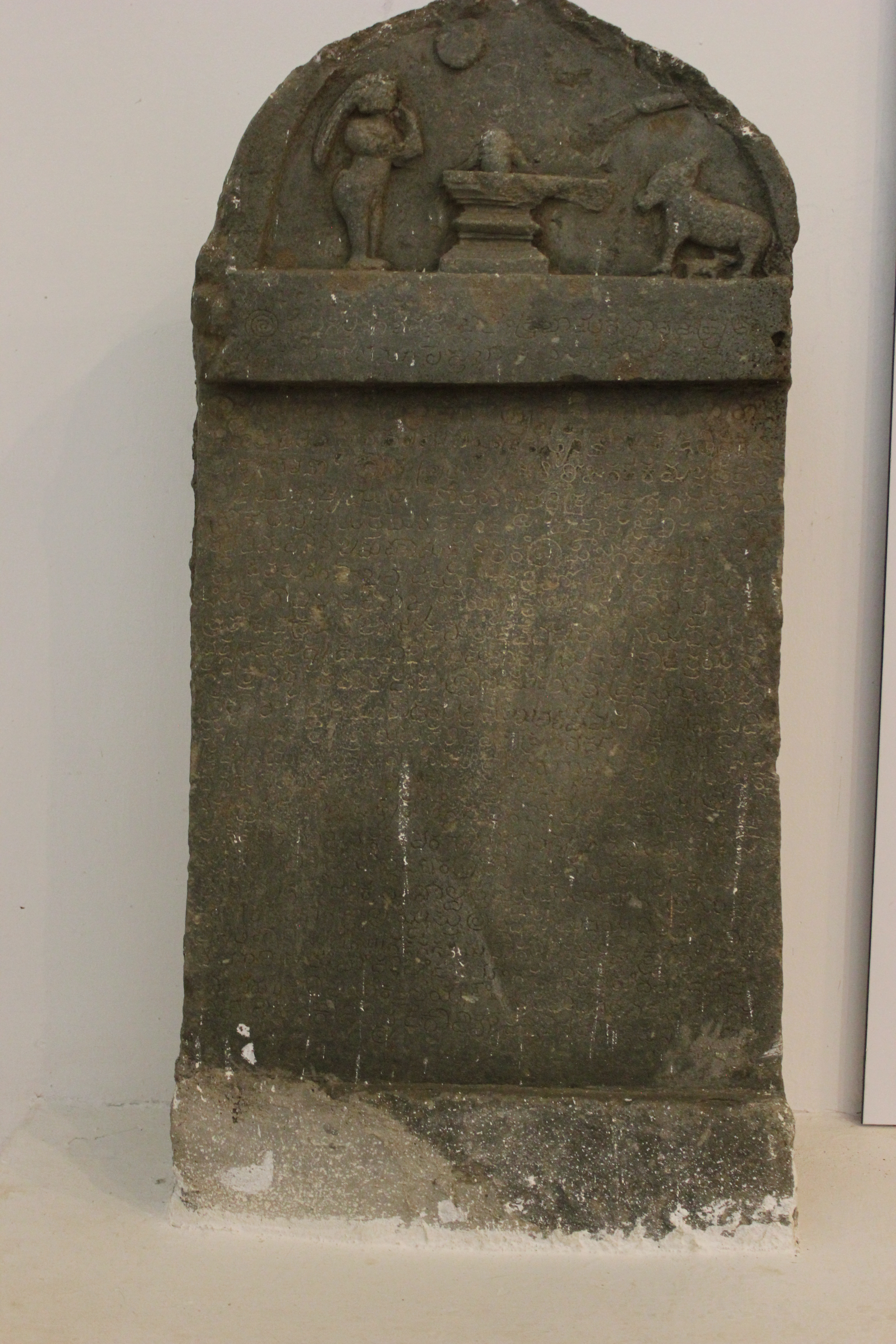
- Old Kannada inscription (c.1148 AD) of Western Chalukya King Jagadekamalla II

Western Chalukya King
- Reign: 1138–1151
- Predecessor: Someshvara III
- Successor: Tailapa III
- House: Chalukya dynasty
- Father: Someshvara III
- Religion: Jainism

Jagadhekamalla II or Jagadhekamalladeva (r. 1138–1151) followed Someshvara III to the Western Chalukya throne. His rule saw the slow decline of the Chalukya empire with the loss of Vengi entirely, though he was still able to control the Hoysalas in the south and the Seuna and Paramara in the north. He patronised Kannada grammarian Nagavarma II, who wrote many famous works including Kavyavalokana and Karnataka Bhashabhushana. Jagadhekamalla II himself was a merited scholar and wrote in Sanskrit Sangithachudamani a work on music.

== Culture and Literature ==
Jagadekamalla II was a follower of Jainism and continued the long-standing tradition of Jain patronage followed by earlier and later rulers of the Western Chalukya dynasty. Several Chalukyan kings-such as Irivabedanga Satyasraya, Jagadekamalla II, Somesvara I, Somesvara II, Vikramaditya VI, Somesvara III, Taila III, and Somesvara IV extended the royal umbrella to Jainism and enhanced its status by patronizing Jain writers, granting lands to Jain teachers, and supporting the construction and maintenance of Jain basadis. Contemporary inscriptions record his donations to Jain temples and monks. His capital at Potlakere (modern Patancheruvu in Medak district) became an important centre for Jain worship, housing numerous basadis and Jaina images. A Maski inscription records donations for a Jaina basadi at Basavoja in 1027 CE, and an inscription at Saidapur records land and cash gifts made under the king's authority to the "Bhodasena" and "Vaidyaratnakara" jinalayas at the request of Jain preceptors. Royal officials and associates who were devout Jains, such as the physician and royal official Aggalayya, also made gifts to Jain temples and founded religious establishments during his reign, reflecting the continued influence of Jain religious culture at court.

Epigraphic evidence from Jagadekamalla II's reign further attests to this patronage. An inscription engraved on all four faces of a pillar preserved at Bandayappa Matha in Bichikunta village (present-day Kamareddy district, Telangana) is dated to Śaka 953 (1031 CE). Written in Kannada language and script, the inscription records the construction of a Kalla Basadi belonging to the Desiyagana Sangha and the installation of a Tirthankara image identified as Chandraprabha Tirthankara. It also documents land grants made by local donors-Senabova Changayya, Palla Chattayya, Boppagorava, Devannayya, and Sovappayya-together with merchant guilds such as the Nakharas and Munnurvaru, as sarvamanya (tax-free) gifts during Jagadekamalla II's reign.

Jagadekamalla II was also a merited scholar. He authored the Sangita-chudamani, a work on music covering topics such as Alapana and Gamaka, qualities of singers and composers, voice culture, and auditorium design. He was the patron of the Jain scholar and grammarian Nagavarma II, author of Kannada works such as Kavya-avalokana and Karnataka-Bhasha-bhushana. The scholar and Jain Acharya Parsvadev author of Sangita Samayasara, followed Jagadekamalla's work on subjects like Ragas and Prabandhas. Sarangadeva's Sangita-ratnakara (early 13th century) also mentions Jagadekamalla (Jagadeka-mahipatih) with respect.

Jagadekamalla's contemporary, Someshvara I, commenced compiling the Manasollasa while he was a prince and completed it around 1129 CE (1051 Saka). The Manasollasa is a monumental encyclopedic work covering subjects such as governance, military strategy, medicine, veterinary science, valuation of precious stones, fortifications, painting, arts, games, amusements, culinary art, dance, and music.

== Sources ==
- Kamat, Dr. Suryanath (2001), A Concise History of Karnataka:(from Pre-historic Times to the Present); Rev. Engl. Version of Karnatakadasankshipta Itihasa, Archana Prakashana, 1980
- Desai, P. B. (1957). Jainism in South India and Some Jaina Epigraphs. Published by the author. pp. 167–168.
- Sen, S.N. (1976), Ancient Indian History and Civilization, New Age International, p. 387, ISBN 978-81-224-1198-0
- Jayapalan, N (2001), History of India, Atlantic, p. 151, ISBN 9788171569281
- Chatterjee, Amitava (2014), History: UGC-NET/SET/JRF (Paper II and III), 1/e, Dorling Kindersley (India) Pvt. Ltd., ISBN 9789332520622
- Tripathi, Rama Shankar (1967), History of Ancient India, MOTILAL BANARSIDASS PUBLISHERS PRIVATE LIMITED, ISBN 9788120800182
- Saletore, B. A. (1938). Medieval Jainism: With Special Reference to the Deccan. Bombay Popular Book Depot.
