= Bengre =

Coordinates: 13°27′N 74°42′E

- village
- Interactive map of Bengre
- Country: India
- State: Karnataka
- District: Uttara Kannada
- Taluk: Bhatkal

Population (2001)
  - Total: 7,718

Languages
  - Official: Kannada
- Time zone: UTC+5:30 (IST)

Bengre is a village in the southern state of Karnataka, India. It is located in the Bhatkal taluk of Uttara Kannada district in Karnataka.

== Demographics ==
As of 2001 India census, Bengre had a population of 7718 with 3672 males and 4046 females.

== See also ==
- Uttara Kannada
- Mangalore
- Districts of Karnataka
