= Bhattakalanka Deva =

Bhaṭṭākalaṅka Deva (also Bhaṭṭākalaṅka) was the third and the last of the notable Kannada grammarians from the medieval period. In 1604 CE, he authored a comprehensive text on old-Kannada grammar called Karnāṭaka Śabdānuśāsana ("A Consequent Teaching on the Language of Karnāṭaka") in 592 Sanskrit aphorisms (Sanskrit: sūtras, a literary form written for concision) with glossary (Sanskrit: vṛtti) and commentary (Skt.: vyākhyā). The work contains useful references to prior poets and writers of Kannada literature and is considered a valuable asset to the student of old-Kannada language. A native of Uttara Kannada and a student of the Haduvalli monastery, the Jain grammarian was learned in over six languages including Kannada, Sanskrit, Prakrit and Magadhi.

== Karnataka Sabdanusasana ==
It is believed that Bhaṭṭākalaṅka Deva may have undertaken the work of writing exhaustively on old Kannada grammar in response to contempt from Sanskrit scholars of the day toward the Kannada language, despite its rich literary tradition. His writing is the third authoritative grammar on old Kannada, the first of which was authored by Nāgavarma II in the mid-12th century and the second by Keśirāja in the mid-13th century. The grammar containing 592 aphorisms is divided into four chapters (Skt.: padas) and each aphorism has a glossary and a lengthy commentary. The authorship of the entire work has been settled with the full credit going to the Bhaṭṭākalaṅka Deva.

The Karnāṭaka Śabdānuśāsana is modelled mostly on the earlier Sanskrit grammars written by Pāṇini, Śākaṭāyana, Śaravarma, Pūjyapāda and others, though some rules have been borrowed from earlier Kannada grammatical works; one or two rules from the Karnāṭaka Bhāṣābhūṣaṇa by Nāgavarma II and about fifteen from Śabdamaṇidarpaṇa by Keśirāja. The first chapter (up to 101 rules) consists of euphonic combinations, technical words, signs of nouns and verbs, numbers and indeclinables. The second chapter (101–299 rules) consists of the gender classification of indigenous Kannada nouns and those inherited from the Sanskrit (Sanskrit: tadbhava "naturalised, loanword" and samāsamaskṛta–non-naturalised). The third chapter (set in 291–441 rules) consists of the compound words and the fourth chapter (written in 442–592 rules) focuses on verbal roots and verbal nouns.

== See also ==
- Jainism in Karnataka
- Jainism in north Karnataka
- Jainism in Tulu Nadu
