= Honnavar taluk =

Honnavar Taluk
- Taluk
- Map of Honnavar Taluk
- Location within Karnataka
- Coordinates: 14.28°N 74.4439°E
- Country: India
- State: Karnataka
- Region: Kanara
- District: Uttara Kannada

Government
  - Body: Taluk Panchayat, Honnavar

Area
  - Total: 754 km^{2} (291 sq mi)

Population (2011)
  - Total: 160,331
  - Density: 213/km^{2} (551/sq mi)

Languages
  - Official: Kannada
- Time zone: UTC+5:30 (IST)
- Telephone code: +91-8387
- Vehicle registration: KA 47

Honnavar Taluk is one of the five coastal taluks in the district of Uttara Kannada in Karnataka, India.

== Geography ==
Honnavar taluk has Arabian Sea to the west, Kumta Taluk to the North, Siddapur and Sagar taluks to the east and Bhatkal taluk to the south. The western part of the taluk towards the Arabian Sea is a plain with Paddy fields, Coconut and Areca plantation while the eastern part has Sahyadri hill range.

== Demographics ==
Religion in Honnavar Taluk
	Percent
Hinduism	82.4%
Islam	9.920%
Christianity	7.47%
Jainism	0.10%
Others†	0.08%
Distribution of religions

As of the Census of 2011, there were 160,331 people, 32,808 households in Honavar Taluk, of which Males constitute 49.9% (80,018) and Females were 50.09% (80,313). A majority of the population (141,222) lives in rural villages while about 19,109 people live in semi-urban Honavar town, which is the headquarters of the taluk.

Most people in Honavar taluk are native speakers of Kannada language. There are sizeable numbers of people who speak other languages such as Konkani and Nawayath. This can be attributed to the fact that Honavar taluk, along with the rest of Uttara Kannada district was under Bombay Presidency till India got independence from the British in 1947. Also, it was part of different kingdoms at different times in the history.

== Places of interest ==
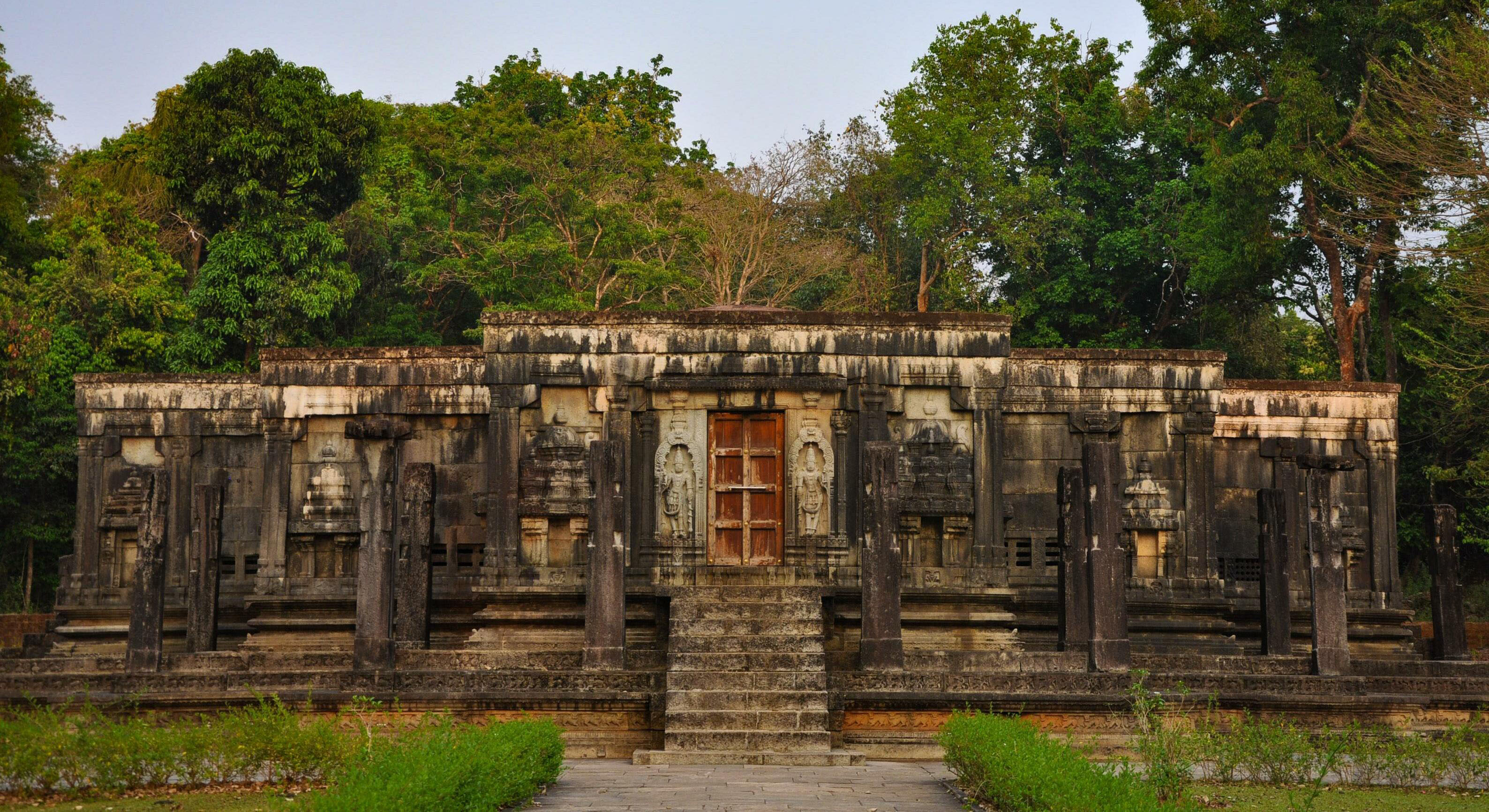
Chaturmukha Basadi, Gerusoppa

- Idagunji, Ganesha Temple
- Karikaanamma, temple dedicated to Goddess Kali.
- Apsarkonda waterfall
- Sharavati river which joins the Arabian Sea at Honnavar.
- Chaturmukha Basadi, a 16th-century symmetrical Jain temple located in Gerusoppa village.
- Colonel Hill Pillar
- Sri Idagunji Mahaganapati Yakshagana Mandali, Keremane, a UNESCO accredited Yakshagana organisation, located in the campus of "Yakshaangana" in Gunavante Village.
- Gunavante, a coastal village known for Shambhulingeshwara temple.
- Ramatirtha, a pushkarini or water tank.
- Kasarkod beach, a Blue Flag certified beach.
- Keppa Jog, a smaller version of Jog Falls.
- Basavaraja Durga, a fortified spot is a 19 hectare island in the Arabian Sea.

== Economy and industry ==
Agriculture and Fishery are the major contributors to the economy of Honavar taluk. There are also a few Roof tile factories in the taluk that are on decline. Cashew nut processing, Beekeeping and Coir processing are the other businesses in the taluk.

== Towns and villages ==
Honavar taluk consists of the following villages and towns.

- Adekekuli
- Adkar
- Adukal
- Anilgod
- Apsarkonda
- Areangadi
- Armudi
- Arolli-Mundagod
- Ashikeri
- Aunsalli
- Balemet
- Balkur
- Begodi
- Beranki
- Berolli
- Birangod
- Chandavar
- Chikkankod
- Dabbod
- Duggur
- Gudemakki
- Gunavante
- Gundabala
- Hadgeri
- Hadikal
- Hadinbal
- Haldipur
- Hanehallikabbinahakkal
- Hebbarahitla
- Heggar
- Herali
- Herangadi
- Heravali
- Hinnur
- Hirebail
- Hodke Shiroor
- Honavar
- Hosad
- Hosakuli
- Hosapatna
- Hosgod
- Hulegar
- Jalwal Karki
- Jalwalli
- Janna Kadkal
- Kadle
- Kadnir
- Kadtoka
- Kankichitta
- Karki
- Kasarkod
- Kavalakki
- Kekkar
- Kelagina Hakkalakeri
- Kelgina-Mudkani
- Kelgin-Idgunji
- Kelgin-Mannige
- Kelginoor
- Keremane
- Kervalli
- Khandodi
- Kharwa
- Kodani
- Koodla
- Kota
- Kuchodi
- Kudrige
- Kulakod
- Madageri
- Magod
- Mahime
- Malkod
- Mallapur
- Mandalakurve
- Manki
- Mavinkurva
- Melina Hakkalakeri
- Melinamudkani
- Melin-Idgunji
- Melin-Mannige
- Molkod
- Mugwa
- mulligadde
- Mutta
- Nagarabastikeri
- Nagre
- Navilgone
- Nelavanki
- Nilkod
- Nirwattikodla
- Padukuli
- Pavinakurve
- Salkod
- Sampolli
- Saralagi
- Shirkur
- Sulebil
- Talgod
- Tumbebeela
- Tumbolli
- Upponi
- Vandoor
