= Hans von Mžik =

Austrian orientalist and geographer (1876–1961)

Hans von Mžik (1876–1961) was an Austrian orientalist and geographer. Starting in 1921 he was head of the map collection at the Austrian National Library and co-founder of the series Museion.

== Selected publications ==
- 1911. Die reise des Arabers Ibn Baṭūṭa durch Indien und China (14. jahrhundert) bearbeitet von dr. Hans von Mžik. Hamburg, Gutenberg-verlag.
