= Karki, Honnavar =

Karki
- village
- Location in Karnataka, India Karki (India)
- Coordinates: 14.3188700°N 74.4446500°E
- Country: India
- State: Karnataka
- Region: Kanara
- District: Uttara Kannada
- Taluk: Honnavar

Government
  - Type: Panchayat raj
  - Body: Gram panchayat

Languages
  - Official: Kannada
- Time zone: UTC+5:30 (IST)
- PIN: 581341
- ISO 3166 code: IN-KA
- Vehicle registration: KA 47
- Lok Sabha constituency: North Kanara
- Website: karnataka.gov.in

Karki is a village in Honnavar Taluk in Uttara Kannada district of Karnataka state, India.

== Etymology ==
The earlier name of Karki was Durvapura. It is believed that Maharishi Durvasa did tapasya here and the old name came from him.

== Geography and climate ==
Karki is situated in the coastal area of Karnataka. It is 5 km away from Honavar town. One side of Karki is the coast of the Arabian sea and the other side are the Sahyadri hills. Badagani river flows through Karki.

Karki is in a coastal area, the weather is hot in summer. It receives heavy rainfall.

== Transport ==
Karki is connected by rail and road. NH-66 (previously NH-17) passes through this place. Honnavara Railway station is situated in Karki. And also boat and Hanging Bridge facility to across River.

== Education ==
Government Primary schools and High school are available in this place. Colleges are nearby situated in Honnavara.

The population in Karki is quite widespread. Many ancient trees and greenery are found in plenty. Agriculture is carried out, especially the transplantation of rice. The paddy is harvested in the months of April–May and dehusked at nearby mills in the neighbouring village. The straw is fed to cattle.

Natural places of beauty includes the beach, the hilly areas with streams, the long stretches of fields and the local temples.
