= Kasarkod =

- village
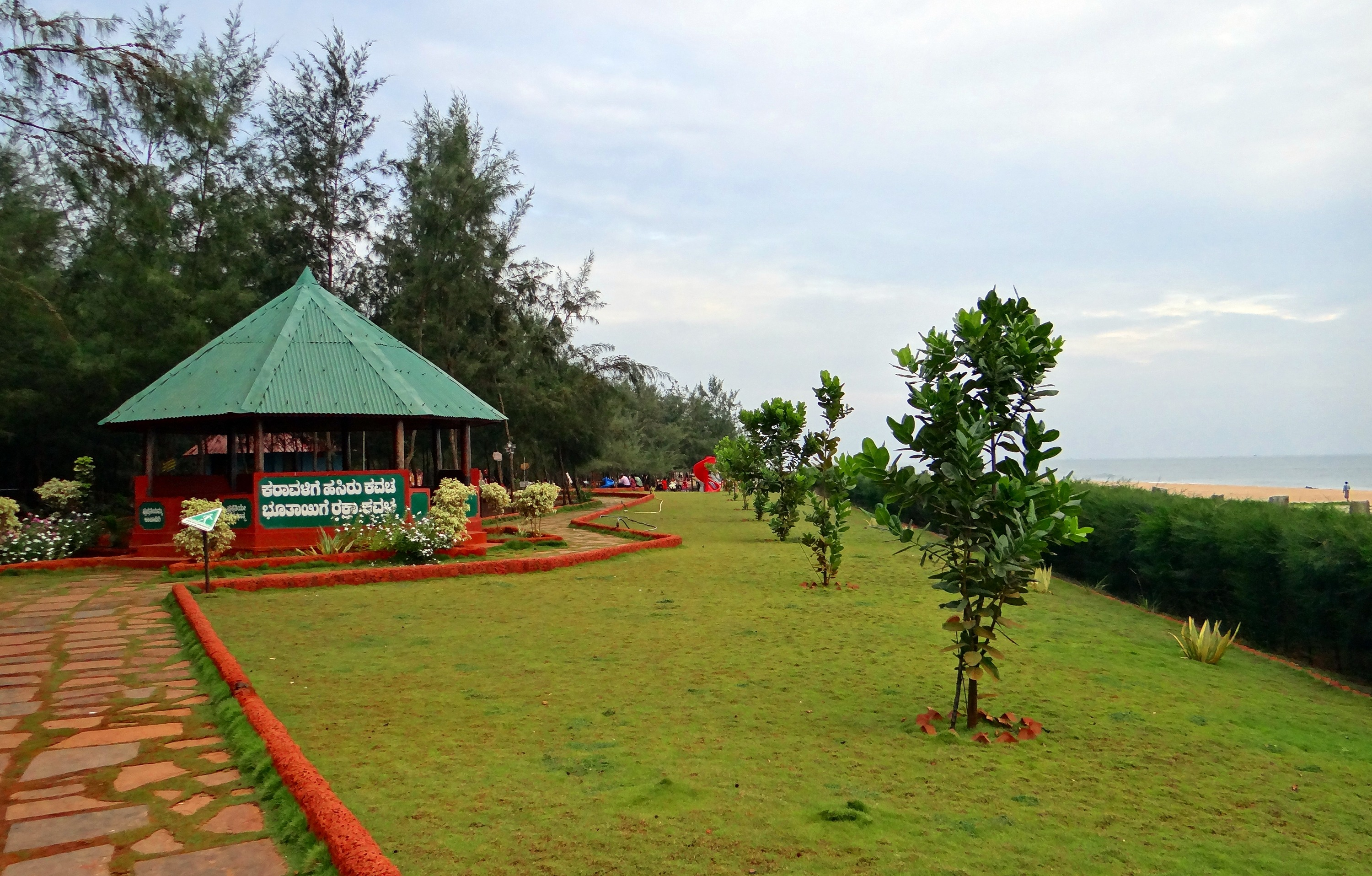
- Kasarkod beach park

- Location in Karnataka, India Kasarkod (India)
- Coordinates: 14°15′N 74°26′E
- Country: India
- State: Karnataka
- District: Uttara Kannada
- Talukas: Honavar

Population (2001)
  - Total: 7,604

Languages
  - Official: Kannada
- Time zone: UTC+5:30 (IST)

Kasarkod is a village in the southern state of Karnataka, India. It is located in the Honavar taluk of Uttara Kannada district in Karnataka.

== Demographics ==
As of 2001 India census, Kasarkod had a population of 7604 with 3801 males and 3803 females. This beach got blue flag certificate along with Padubidri Karnataka which got blue flag. The official name of the beach is "Dhareshwar Beach " as mentioned in the official website of Uttar Kannada. District

== See also ==
- Uttara Kannada
- Mangalore
- Districts of Karnataka
