= Karki, Madhya Pradesh =

Karki
- village
- Location in Madhya Pradesh, India Karki (India)
- Coordinates: 23.8223900°N 81.4087300°E
- Country: India
- State: Madhya Pradesh
- District: Shahdol

Languages
  - Official: Hindi
- Time zone: UTC+5:30 (IST)
- ISO 3166 code: IN-MP
- Vehicle registration: MP

Karki is a village in Shahdol district in the state of Madhya Pradesh, India.
