= Shri Karikaana Parameshwari =

Hindu temple in Karnataka, India

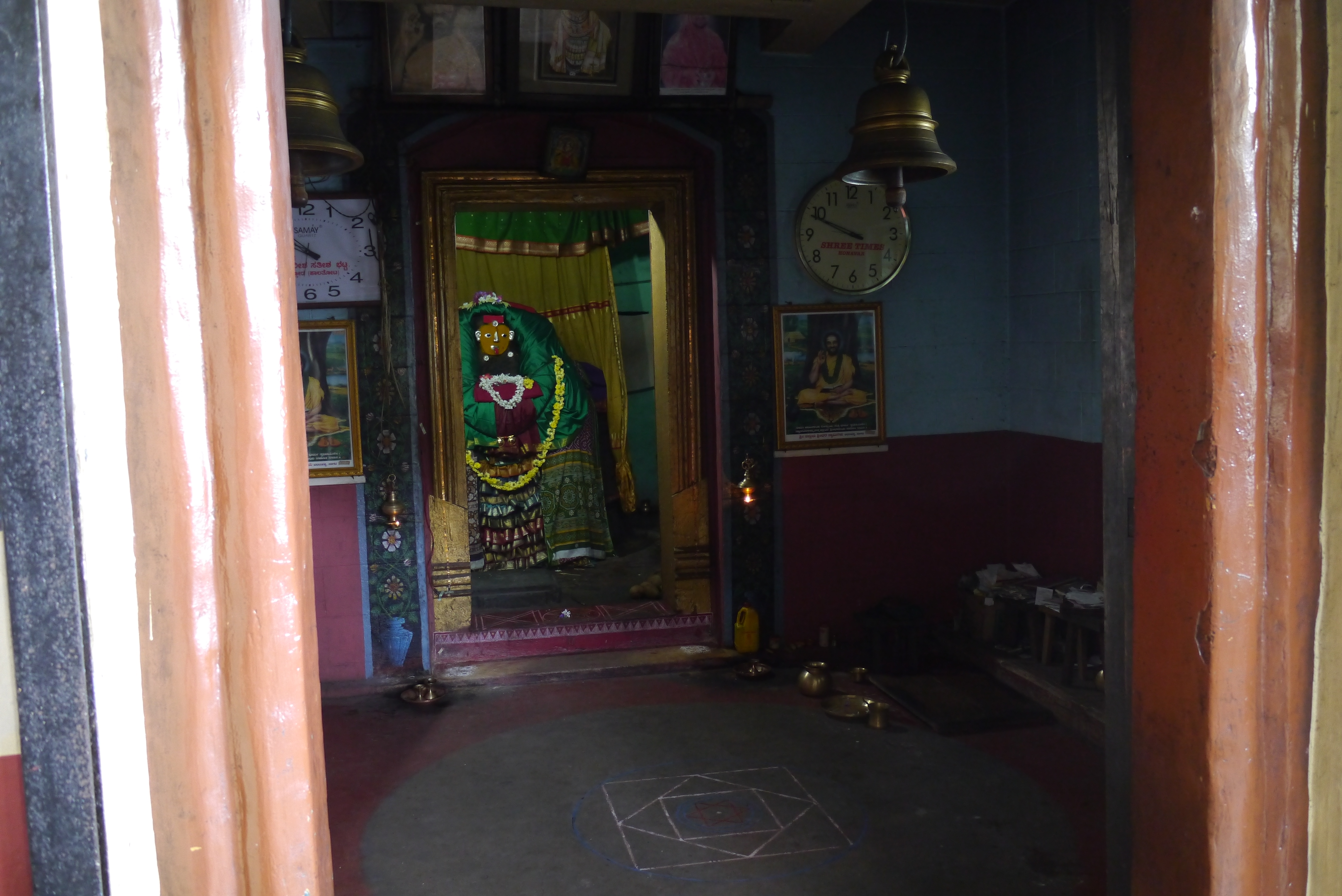
Sri Karikana Parameshwari Temple

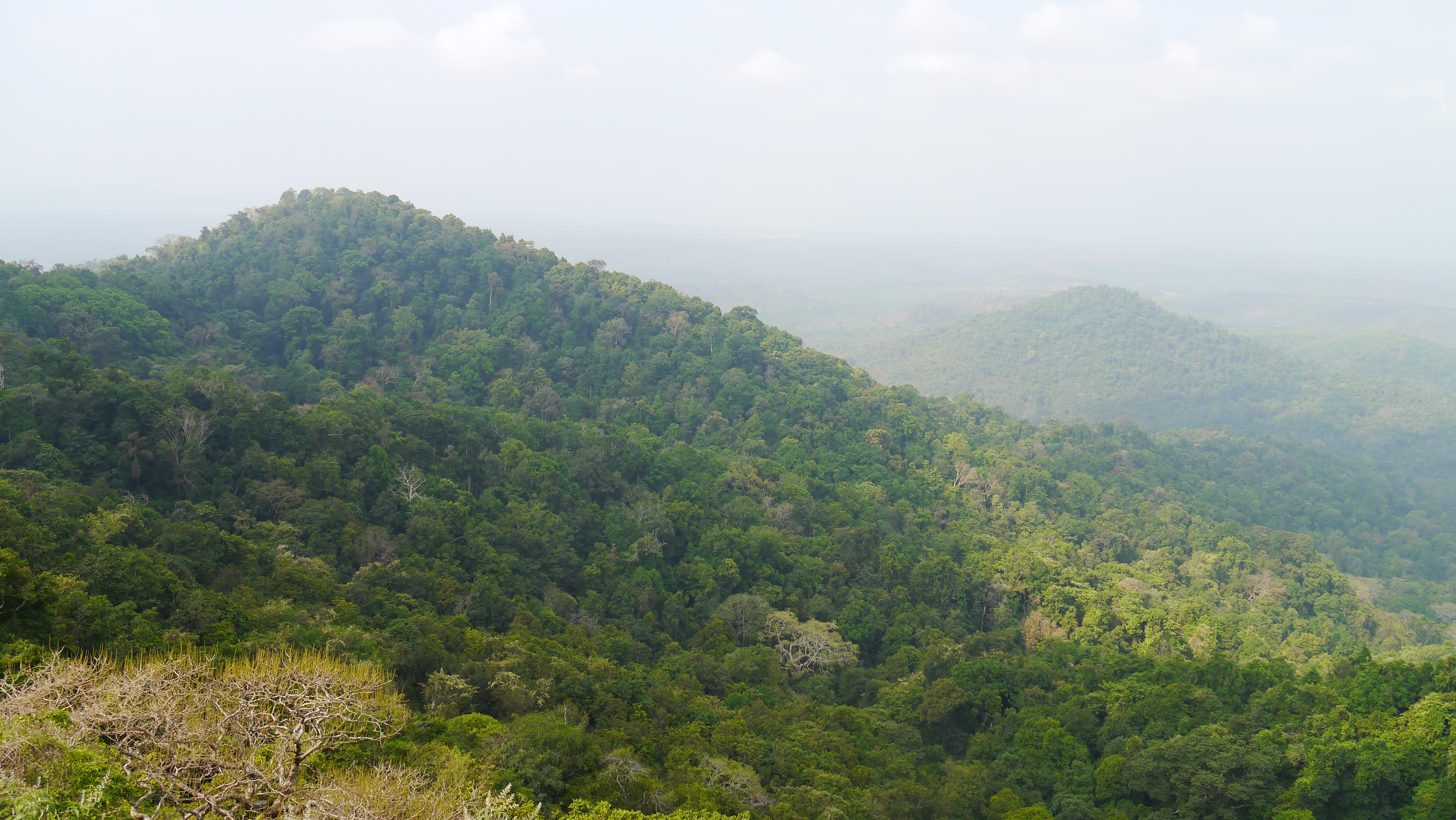
View from the temple

Karikaanamma or Shri Karikaan Parameshwari is a Hindu goddess temple in the Western Ghats in Karnataka, India, located near the town of Honnavar, established by Shreedhar Swami. Garbhagudi is carved out of a single rock. In 1970s when Indira Gandhi visited the temple, roads were fully built up to uphill. It is located in the very dense forest, so it is a favorite spot for nature lovers. There are views of the Arabian Sea from the top of the mountain. It is dedicated to the deity Kali (Devanāgarī: काली). Ondadke or Vandadake Shambhulingehwara temple is also nearby to this place.
