= Nawayathi language =

Indo-Aryan language in India

Nawayathi
- نوائطی
- Native to: India
- Region: Bhatkal
- Ethnicity: Nawayaths
- Language family: Indo-European: Indo-Iranian; Indo-Aryan; Southern Zone; Marathi–Konkani; Nawayathi
- Writing system: Persian

Language codes
- ISO 639-3: None (mis)
- Glottolog: None

Nawayathi (IPA: [nəʋajət̪iː], also spelled Nawayati), is a language similar to Konkani spoken by Nawayaths of the southwestern coast of India. It is an amalgam of Persian, Arabic and Marathi, with Konkani as its base. The Nawayathi language uses Persian script for writing.

== Proposed Inclusion of Nawayathi Script in Unicode ==
4 forms of three new letters in Nawayathi script, Top character which sounds between t͡ʃ and s, Middle character which sounds ɳ and Bottom character which sounds ɭ.

In 2019, initiatives were undertaken to preserve the Nawayathi language and prevent its extinction through the inclusion of three additional characters in the Nawayathi script. A prototype keyboard incorporating these characters was also introduced to the public to facilitate digital use and promote the language's vitality.
