= Bhatkal =

- City
- Interactive map of Bhatkal
- Location in Karnataka, India Location in India
- Coordinates: 13.967°N 74.567°E
- Country: India
- State: Karnataka
- District: Uttara Kannada

Government
  - Type: City Municipal Council
  - Body: Bhatkal City Municipal Council

Area
  - Total: 355.50 km^{2} (137.26 sq mi)
- Elevation: 3 m (9.8 ft)

Population (2011)
  - Total: 32,000
  - Density: 90/km^{2} (230/sq mi)
- Demonym(s): Bhatkali, Bhatkally, Bhatkalite

Languages
  - Official: Kannada
  - Regional/Spoken: Kannada, Urdu, Nawayathi (Konkani)
- Time zone: UTC+5:30 (IST)
- PIN: 581320
- Telephone code: +91-8385
- Vehicle registration: KA-47
- Website: bhatkalcity.mrc.gov.in

Bhatkal (Kannada: [bʰɐʈkɐɭɐ]) is a coastal city in the Uttara Kannada District of the Indian state of Karnataka. Bhatkal lies on National Highway 66, which runs between Mumbai and Kanyakumari, and has Bhatkal railway station which is one of the major railway stations along the Konkan Railway line, which runs between Mumbai and Mangalore.

== History ==
=== Toponymy ===
Bhatkal was named after Jain grammarian, Bhattakalanka, who hailed from Hadwalli village, a town on the state highway toward Jog Falls, Shimoga. It was also known as Susagadi, and Manipura in Sanskrit. Francis Hamilton referred to it as Batuculla, which means 'round town'.

Some have claimed that Marathi influence is responsible for the word's derivation. According to M. Shanker Linge Gowda, when the military leaders of the Patwardhan family under the Peshwas periodically invaded and pillaged the Manipura kingdom, they called it Vatkul, which means 'hills around the town', because the Manipura fort was located in a valley surrounded by hills. In slang, Vatkul eventually evolved into Bhatkal.

The term Bhatkal originated and can be found in one of the oldest manuscripts of Nawayathi from 1688 A.D. by Akhun Seedy Mohammed. The author mentions the old name for Bhatkal as Abadaqilla. However the word itself is susceptible to alteration, and it is quite likely that initially it was Abadaqilla, meaning 'inhabited fort,' and subsequently changed into badaqilla, and finally Bhatkal. Such a name can be applied only by Arabs, who have been associated with the place for a very long time.

Name variations include Batigala (by Friar Jordanus, 1328), Batticala (by Barbosa, 1510), Baticala (De Barros), Batticola (Logan, 1887).

=== Medieval ===
Bhatkal witnessed the rise and fall of several dynasties and rulers. The Chola empire under Aditya I, his son, Parantaka I, and Sundara Chola, also known as Parantaka Chola II, initially invaded and conquered territories in Kannada country, between Gangavadi on the Mysuru plateau and Bhatkal on the Sahyadri Coast, between 880 CE and 975 CE. They later built the Solesvara Temple to commemorate their victory over the region.

In 1291, it was a part of the Hoysala Empire before passing into Nawayath Sultanate control from the beginning of the 14th century until 1350s. According to Ibn-e-Battuta, it was a vassal state under the ruler Haryab, which the historian George Moraes identified as Harihara-nripala of the Kingdom of Gersoppa. Later, when it was under the control of the Vijayanagar Empire, spices, sugar, and other masalas were traded with them. According to Ibrahim Khori, powdered sugar, brown sugar, as well as sugar itself, were produced in Bhatkal.

In 1479, Bhatkal and Honnavar were once again attacked by the Vijayanagar Empire over an alleged conspiracy over the trade between the Bahmani Sultanate. Vijayakirthi II constructed a town named 'Bhattakala' for his disciple, the king Devaraya. The rulers of Haduvalli were from the Saluva (Jain) Dynasty, and the Bhattakalanka was the last and well-known grammarian of Haduvalli as per the Biligi Ratnatraya Basadi inscription. During the reign of Narasimha Deva Raya, he ended the tyranny of Virupaksha and re-established the friendship with the Nawayath.

=== Modern ===
On 28 August 1502, Vasco de Gama-led Portuguese forces attacked and burned the port in the town that was under the control of the Kingdom of Gersoppa, a vassal state of the Vijayanagar Empire, and forced it to comply with Portuguese demands. In 1606, it came under the control of the Nayakas of Ikkeri (also known as the Nayakas of Keladi) after the war between Venkatappa Nayaka and Bairadevi. In 1637, it became the territory of the Dutch East India Company. The British were unsuccessful in their attempts to establish an agency through locals in 1638 and a corporation in 1668.

The Keladi Nayakas invited Kazi Mahmoud, who was a grandson of the Chief Kazi of the Adil Shahi kingdom of Bijapur, to settle in Bhatkal in the year 1670. The revenue of Tenginagundi village was given to Kazi Mahmoud. The Kazi family of Bhatkal is popularly known as the Temunday Family due to the ownership of lands in Tenginagundi. Many Nawayath Muslims were appointed to the administrative positions. The families of these nobles from Nawayath still use Ikkeri as their surname and are mainly settled in and around Bhatkal. The Golden Kalasa on the dome of Bhatkal Jamia Masjid, popularly known as 'Chinnada Palli' meaning 'Golden Mosque' is believed to be a generous gift from Keladi rulers.

From the Keladi rulers, Bhatkal passed on to the Mysore Sultanate. Hyder Ali and Tipu Sultan made Bhatkal the main base on the Canara Coast for their newly built naval force, with the help of the Dutchman Joze Azelar. Later, Tipu Sultan built a mosque in 1793, and a street was named after him. One of Tipu's wives was from Bhatkal. Bhatkal later came into the hands of the British Empire in 1799 after they defeated Tipu. In 1862, Bhatkal was annexed to the Bombay Presidency. With the reorganization of the state in 1956, the town became a part of Karnataka State in 1960, and the sub-taluks of Bhatkal and Supa were upgraded into full-fledged taluks.

== Geography ==
Bhatkal is a coastal town situated at the southernmost point of the Uttara Kannada district in the Indian state of Karnataka. It lies near the banks of the Sharabi River and is bounded by the Arabian Sea to the west and the Western Ghats to the east. The town is administered by a municipal council and spans an area of 5.23 km^{2} (2.02 sq mi). The region is known for its distinctive flora, including unique varieties of Eriocaulon lanceolatum and Jasminum sambac. Its topography includes a lateritic belt, which covers 7.43% of the open land, supporting predominantly evergreen to semi-evergreen and moist deciduous forests. The area contains mineral deposits such as hematitic iron ore, bauxite, china clay (kaolin), and fine- to medium-grained white silica sand, located along the shoreline near Bengre.

=== Rivers ===
Venkatapur River flows through the north of the town center approximately 50 km before joining the Arabian Sea at Tenginagundi. The river has a catchment area of 459.70 sq.km, spanning Bhatkal in Uttara Kannada and Sagar in Shimoga. Its two tributaries, Chitti and Katagari, join from the north. The Sarabi River originates in the Western Ghats and flows westward for approximately 20 km through Uttara Kannada district. It passes about 5 km from the town of Bhatkal before reaching the Arabian Sea. The river supports a major fishing harbor in Bhatkal, featuring a 186-metre-long wharf.

=== Islands ===
Hog Island, also known as Jallikund Gudda, is an uninhabited island located in the Arabian Sea, approximately 6.68 kilometres off the coast of Bhatkal. The island covers an area of approximately 1.77 km^{2} (0.68 sq mi) and has a shoreline of about 1.77 kilometres.

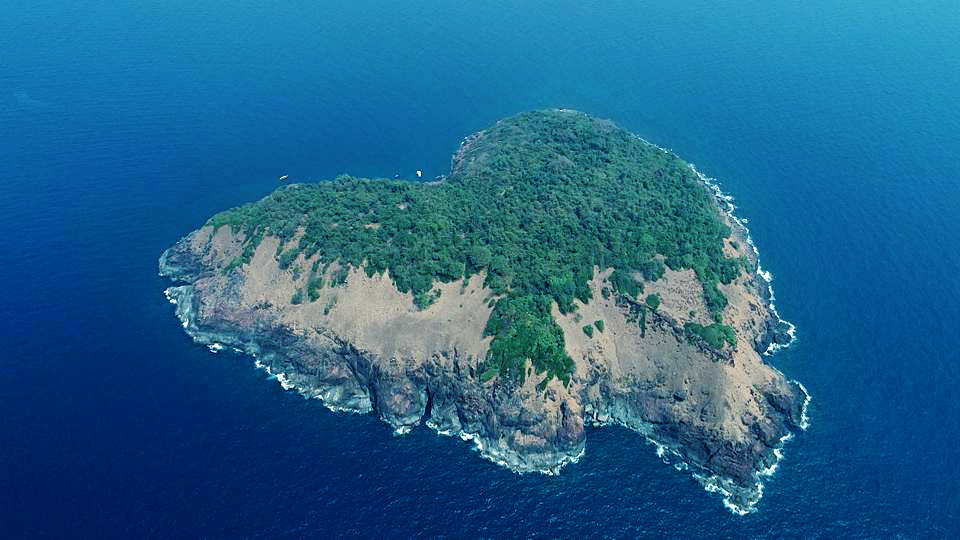
Aerial view of Netrani island

Netrani Island, also referred to as Pigeon Island, is a small, heart-shaped island that lies approximately 19 kilometres (11.8 miles) from Murdeshwar and is characterised by dense evergreen vegetation, with species of Ficus being dominant. Ornithological surveys have recorded at least 300 individual birds representing 40 species, 32 genera, 27 families, and 10 orders in and around the island’s coastal waters.

Other minor islands in the region include Kerekund, comprising two islets, and Hadi Madi, consisting of three islets. Both island groups are uninhabited, and limited information is available regarding their geography and ecology.

== Culture ==
Unlike other states, Nawayathi men wear lungis, which are stitched in the middle and are cylindrical in shape.

=== Festivals ===
==== Hariseva Karya ====
Hariseva Karya is a traditional religious festival observed in Bhatkal and associated with the veneration of Tirupati Thimmappa. The celebration, typically conducted over several days by individual families, creates a village-wide festive atmosphere with the participation of relatives and community members. The celebration is estimated to draw between 5,000 to 10,000 devotees during its observance.

The festival includes rituals such as the ceremonial decoration of a Kalasha near a river or water body, its procession to the household, worship at the Tulasikatte, and community feasts (annadanam) attended by large numbers of devotees. Certain customary observances, including symbolic hunting rituals and the Jogi ceremony, are also part of the traditional proceedings.

The residents celebrate other festivals such as Eid ul Fitr, Ramadan, Eid al azha, Muharram, Milad un nabi, Makara Sankranti, Nagara Panchami, Krishna Janmashtami, Ganesh Chaturthi, Navaratri, Deepavali. Folk sports like Kambala and folk arts like Yakshagana are also popular.

=== Cuisine ===
Bhatkali cuisine is a blend of Yemeni and Konkan cuisine. Bhatkali biryani is an integral part of the Nawayath cuisine and a specialty of Bhatkal, prepared with basmati rice that has been spiced with full garam masala and saffron. Separately, pieces of mutton, chicken, fish, or prawns are cooked. Some people even refer to it as a layered korma and rice meal with fried onions, curry, or mint leaves on top. Another type of biryani is shayya biryani, made from vermicelli (shayyo) instead of rice. The dishes used for breakfast are theek and goad thari (sweet and spicy semolina), gavan or thalla shayyo (wheat or rice vermicelli), varieties of appo (pancakes), fau (poha), theek and goad khubus (sweet and spicy bread), masala poli (heavy spiced paratha), 7 padra Navri, Albasra Poli, Bafaqi Poli, Hladi Pana Navri, Shinouna Nawari, Watwa Nawari, gavan poli (wheat paratha), and puttu (steamed cakes) and son.

== Transport ==
Bhatkal is connected to other cities and states in India by roads and railways. The National Highway 66 (India) crosses the town, which had a major impact on its development. Under the Konkan Railway, many trains run day and night to and from the town. The Bhatkal railway station has two platforms. The nearest airports to Bhatkal are Mangalore International Airport and Goa-Dabolim International Airport. The town has one large, one medium, and one small fishing port.

== Demographics ==
Religion in Bhatkal town (2011)
	Percent
Muslim	74.14%
Hindu	25.21%
Christian	0.59%
Jain	0.02%
Others†	0.02%
Distribution of religions †Includes No Religion (0.01%), Buddhism (0.01%).

As per the 2011 India census, Bhatkal had a population of approximately 32,000 out of which, 16,417 were males and 15,583 were females. Bhatkal has an average literacy rate of 94.12%, with 96.28% and 91.86% of male and female literacy, respectively. Around 11% of the town's total population is under age 5. Scheduled Castes constitute 2.08% and Scheduled Tribes constitute 1.04% of the total population.

== Governance ==
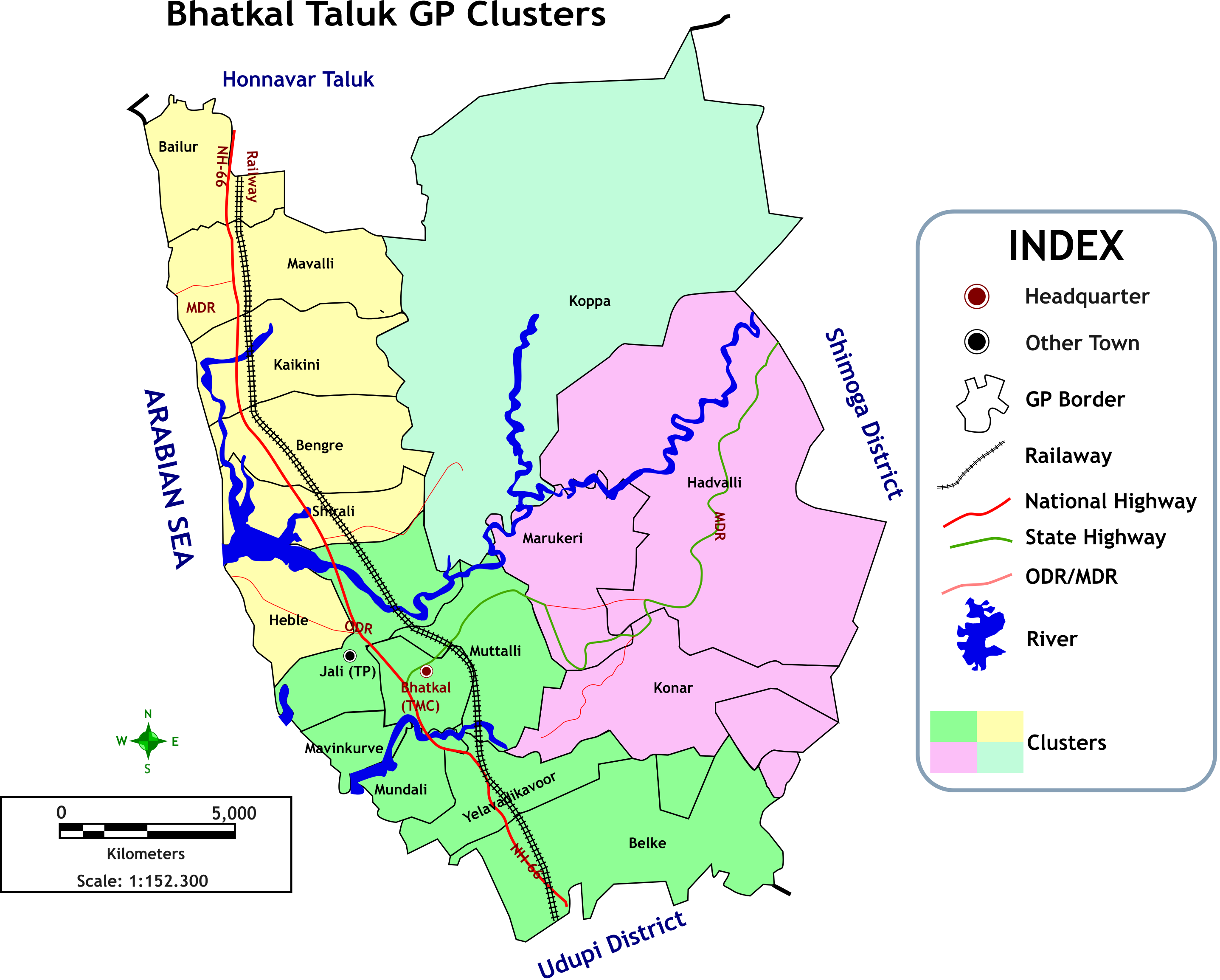
Gram Panchayat division of Bhatkal Taluk

Bhatkal municipality was founded in 1890 and was part of Honnavar Taluk; a decade later, in 1903, the income was 6500 rupees. Two small mosques and two large mosques existed within the town. The town municipal council is divided into 23 wards, for which elections are held every 5 years. Bhatkal Taluk has 15 Gram Panchayats, one Town Panchayat, and one Town Municipal Council, whereas it has 59 villages, 2 census towns, and Bhatkal as its headquarters.

According to an announcement by state minister Mankal Vaidya, the upgradation of the Bhatkal Town Municipal Council was approved by the Karnataka Cabinet in August 2025. Under the approval, the Jali Pattan Panchayat and the Heble Gram Panchayat would be merged with the City Municipal Council. In November 2025, the notification was issued by the Directorate of Municipal Administration regarding the official upgrade. The area of the City Municipal Council spans 22.67 square kilometres (8.75 sq mi). In April 2026, Babasaheb Mane assumed charge as the first municipal commissioner of the newly established City Municipal Council.

Bhatkal is a State Assembly constituency in Uttara Kannada district and the coastal Karnataka region of Karnataka. It is a part of the Uttara Kannada Parliamentary constituency. Mankal Vaidya, of the INC, is the incumbent MLA.

== Notable people ==
- Anant Nag – Actor and politician, born in Chitrapur, Bhatkal.
- Ilyas Nadwi Bhatkali, Indian Islamic scholar, founder of Moulana Abul Hasan Ali Nadvi Academy, Bhatkal and its Quran Museum
- Rajoo Bhatkal (born 1985), Indian cricketer, captain of Malnad Gladiators
- Satyajit Bhatkal, Indian director of film and television
- Shamshuddin Jukaku, Indian politician, first minister from Bhatkal in the Government of Mysore State, deputy chief minister in the 1950s
- SM Syed Khaleel, Indian community leader founder of Jamia Islamia Bhatkal, awarded the Karnataka Rajya Utsav Award
- Zubair Kazi, Indian-American businessman, second-largest KFC franchisee
- Pandari Bai (1930–2003), Indian actress in South Indian cinema
- Mynavathi (1935–2012), Indian actress and younger sister of Pandari Bai.
- Maulana Abdul Bari Nadwi (1962–2016), imam and khateeb and principal of Jamia Islamia Bhatkal
- Mohammed Hussain Fitrat (d. 2018), better known as Fitrat Hussain Bhatkali, Indian poet of Nawayathi, Konkani and Urdu

== See also ==
- Jamia Islamia Bhatkal
- Bhatkal and Sen
- Venkatapur, Bhatkal, Karnataka
- Nawayath
- Murdeshwar
- Ternamakki
- Konar
