= Nawayath =

Indian community and a subgroup of Konkani Muslims

The Nawayath (IPA: [nəʋajət̪], also spelled as Navayath and Nawayat and also called Nait, Naiti, Naithee and Naita) are an Indian community and a subgroup of Konkani Muslims. They speak the Nawayathi language with Konkani as its base.

The term, as described by Qanoon-e-Islam, Mark Wilks and The Imperial Gazetteer of India, means "new comers" in Persian, referring to Arab emigrants in India.

Indian historian Omar Khalidi says they are one of three groups of Indian Muslims who have used the Nawayath name. These groups have common origins in Oman, Yemen, the Persian Gulf and the Iran and Iraq regions, where they were mariners and merchants. One group is based mainly in Bhatkal, Manki, Tonse, Malpe, Shiroor, Gangolli, Sagar, Kumta, Kandlur and Murdeshwar villages in Karnataka, while another is found in Chennai in Tamil Nadu. The third group are generally known today as Konkani Muslims, after the region in which they live.

== History ==
Nawayats are migrants predominantly from Yemen and Persia, who married into another trading community of India, the Jains who had been converted to Islam more than 1,000 years ago. With this a new caste system emerged, as the Nawayats marry within the community.

Saadatullah Khan I, a Nawayat Konkani Muslim, was the Nawab of the Carnatic under the Mughal Empire.
