= Acharya (surname) =

Acharya आचार्य
- Pronunciation: Ācārya
- Language: Nepali, Doteli, Kumaoni, Bengali, Hindi, Odia, Marathi

Origin
- Language: Sanskrit
- Meaning: Teacher

Other names
- Variant forms: Achari, Acharia, Acharjee, Acharja
- See also: Vishwakarma, Pandey

Acharya (Hindi: आचार्य, Nepali: आचार्य/आचार्ज, Bengali: আচার্য, Odia: ଆଚାର୍ଯ୍ୟ , Punjabi: ਅਚਾਰਜੀ) is a surname mainly found in the South Asian countries of India, Bangladesh and Nepal. Notable people with the surname include:

- Baburam Acharya (1888–1971), Nepalese historian and writer
- Bhakta Raj Acharya, Nepalese singer
- Bhanubhakta Acharya, Nepalese poet, originator of Nepalese poetic trend
- Tanka Prasad Acharya, former Prime Minister of Nepal
- Bhim Acharya, Nepalese politician
- Binayak Acharya, former Chief Minister of Odissa, India
- Bodhraj Acharya, Nepalese scientist
- Dilaram Acharya, Nepalese politician
- Dilliram Sharma Acharya, Bhutanese-Nepalese poet
- Drona Prasad Acharya, Nepalese politician
- Ganesh Acharya, Indian choreographer
- Gyan Chandra Acharya, Nepalese diplomat
- Hari Bansha Acharya, Nepalese comedian and actor
- Hemaben Acharya (1933–2025), Indian politician
- Jagannath Acharya, Nepalese freedom fighter, and former cabinet minister
- Lekh Nath Acharya, Nepalese politician
- M. P. T. Acharya, Indian politician and co-founder of the Communist Party of India
- Mahesh Acharya, Nepalese politician and former cabinet minister
- Narahari Acharya, Nepalese politician and former cabinet minister
- Padmapani Acharya (1969–1999), Indian Army officer
- Prasanna Acharya, Indian politician
- Sandeep Acharya, Indian singer, Indian idol of season 2
- Sanjit Acharya, Bangladeshi singer, composer, playwright, and lyricist
- Satya - Swaroop Raj Acharya, Nepalese singers
- Shailaja Acharya, former Deputy Prime Minister of Nepal
- Srikanta Acharya, Indian singer, songwriter and music director
- Surya Raj Acharya, Nepali politician, professor, development expert and author
- Suryakant Acharya, Indian politician
- Tanka Prasad Acharya, former Prime Minister of Nepal
- Triveni Acharya, Indian journalist
- V. S. Acharya, Indian politician from Karnataka
- Vijay Krishna Acharya, Indian film director, scriptwriter
- Viral Acharya, Indian economist

== See also ==
- Acharjee
- Achar (surname)
- Achari (surname)
- Acharia (disambiguation)
