= Naika =

Naika is a feminine given name, possibly derived from Sanskrit nāyikā (नायिका), meaning 'female guide, leader, chief'. It also occurs as a surname.

Notable people with the name include:

- Eliane Rosa Naika (born 1955), Malagasy politician
- Naïka (born 1995), American-born French-Haitian singer
- Naïka Champaïgne (born 1995), Haitian-Canadian musician
- Naika Foroutan (born 1971), German social scientist
- Naika Toussaint (born 1988), Canadian actress
- Nayka Benítez (born 1989), also known as Naika Benítez, Puerto Rican volleyball player

== See also ==
- Naik (disambiguation)
- Nayak (disambiguation)
- Nayika
