= Achari =

Achari may refer to:

- Achari (surname), used in South India
- Two communities in India:
  - Vishwakarma (caste)
  - Charodi (community)
