= Acharjee =

Acharjee (Bengali: আচার্য, Punjabi: ਅਚਾਰਜੀ) is a surname of Indian subcontinet origin, a variant of Acharya. Notable people with the surname include:

- Amal Acharjee, Indian politician
- Kaushal Acharjee (born 1990), Indian cricketer

== See also ==
- Achar (surname)
- Acharia (disambiguation)
