= Naik =

Naik may refer to:

== Places ==
- Naik, Iran, a village in Sistan and Baluchestan Province
- Naik, South Khorasan, a village in South Khorasan Province
- Naic, Cavite (previously Naik), a municipality in the province of Cavite, Philippines

== Other ==
- Naik (surname), list of people with the name
- Naik (social group), tribal community residing primarily in the regions of Gujarat, Malwa, and Punjab
- Naik (military rank), the equivalent to corporal in the Indian and Pakistan armies
- Naik Maratha, a Marathi-speaking community found in Sindhudurg district of Maharashtra, Karnataka, Telangana, and neighboring Pernem
- Namadhari Naik, a Hindu Kshatriya community who follow Vaishnavism

== See also ==
- Naika, feminine given name
- Naiker, a title used across India
- Nayak (disambiguation)
- Nayakan (disambiguation)
