= Charodi =

Charodi may refer to:

- Charodi, Gujarat, a village in Gujarat, India
- Charodi (community), a community from Karnataka, India
