= Namadhari Naik =

Namadhari ನಾಮಧಾರಿ

Regions with significant populations
- Uttara Kannada, Udupi

Languages
- Kannada

Religion
- Hinduism

Namadhari Naik, also known as Hale paika, is a Hindu community predominantly found in Uttara Kannada of Karnataka State in India, and forms the numerical majority in the region. Traditionally, members of the Namadhari Naik community have been engaged in agriculture, military service, and priesthood. The surnames Nayak (ನಾಯಕ), Naik (ನಾಯ್ಕ) and Namadhari (ನಾಮಧಾರಿ) are commonly used among community members, signifying their status and lineage.

== Origin ==
There is little known about the origins of this community. However, based on evidence that one of their sects' guru or leader was located in Anegundi of the Vijayanagara Empire (commonly known as Karnataka empire), it is inferred that their traditions are linked to the Vijayanagara Empire. They are presumed to have been part of the Hindu kingdom of the Vijayanagara Empire, possibly serving as soldiers within its formidable military forces.

== Sub groups ==
Disregarding various myths and legends, the Halepaika community comprises two sub-groups: [1] Tengina Deewaru (Coconut Palm), who live along the coast, known as Namadharis or Trinamadharis, and [2] Bayine Deewaru or Kānu Deewaru, who reside in the hill regions. The names Namadhari or Trinamadhari come from the followers of Sri Ramanuja's sect, with the Trinamadharis claiming social superiority over the Namadharis. However, according to the 1901 census, most identified themselves as Namadharis. The term "Hale" means ancient or old, and "Paika" refers to soldiers, indicating their martial background. During the British colonial period, the Halepaikas were known as troublesome martial tribes. At various times, they served as a military force for the rulers of Vijayanagara and the coastal chieftains.

The term "Deewaru" relates to "Teewaru," meaning islanders, indicating a connection to island origins. This is supported by Malabar traditions that speak of some Dravidian tribes migrating to Sri Lanka and then spreading along the northern coastal regions upon their return. Thus, they are also referred to as islanders. Anthropological studies highlight similarities between the Halepaikas and the Thiyyas.

In ancient times, the Halepaikas were organized into social groups based on different clans known as "Balis (ಬಳಿ)," named after elements of nature like trees, snakes, or animals, believed to be the totems of the clan's ancestors. The Bali names were often derived from nature, indicating a deep connection to the environment and possibly the occupations or social status within the community. Marriages were conducted outside one's own Bali to maintain genetic diversity. A distinctive feature of this community's Balis is that the origin of the Balis is traced through women, not men. Observing this practice suggests that this community has its roots in the practice of polyandry that existed in South India.

== The Ancient Social Structure and traditions ==
In ancient times, the Halepaikas were a settled and cohesive community. They inhabited the Uttara Kannada district, where they had meticulously organized their domains into twelve distinct sectors. The coastal regions of the Halepaika territory were divided into:

1) Chandavar 2) Mirjan 3) Gerusoppa 4) Ankola

Chandavar was esteemed among these sectors, with Konalli, situated in its vicinity, regarded as the cultural and spiritual heartland of the community, often referred to as the "motherland". The dwellings they occupied bore no mark of peculiarity, embodying the simplicity of their way of life.

The hill territories of the Halepaikas were segmented into:

1) Yellapur 2) Sonda 3) Karwar 4) Sirsi 5) Hulekal 6) Banavasi 7) Isloor 8) Bilgi

Each sector was composed of numerous villages, bound together by a shared identity and common traditions. Leadership within each sector was vested in a "Buddhivanta" or chief, a title passed down through generations. This chief held the authority to convene assemblies aimed at resolving communal disputes. Matters that remained unsettled were escalated to the landlord, who served as the overarching chief for several sectors. In those times, the Halepaikas maintained a strict social boundary, refraining from assimilating individuals from other castes into their fold.

=== Dietary Practices ===
The Halepaikas traditionally consume a variety of meats as part of their diet, including poultry, mutton and several types of fish.

== Notable people ==
- Shivanand Naik, former minister, Government of Karnataka

== See also ==
- Billava
- Idiga
- Ezhava
