= Achari (surname) =

Indian surname

Achari of Achary is an Indian surname. Notable people with the surname include:

- Jagathy N. K. Achary, Indian dramatist and writer
- K. Appukuttan Achary, Artist, sculptor and painter from India
- Manikandan R. Achari (born 1980), Indian actor
- P. D. T. Achary, Indian politician

== See also ==
- Achar (surname)
- Acharya (surname)
- Acharia (disambiguation)
