= Journal of Comparative Literature and Aesthetics =

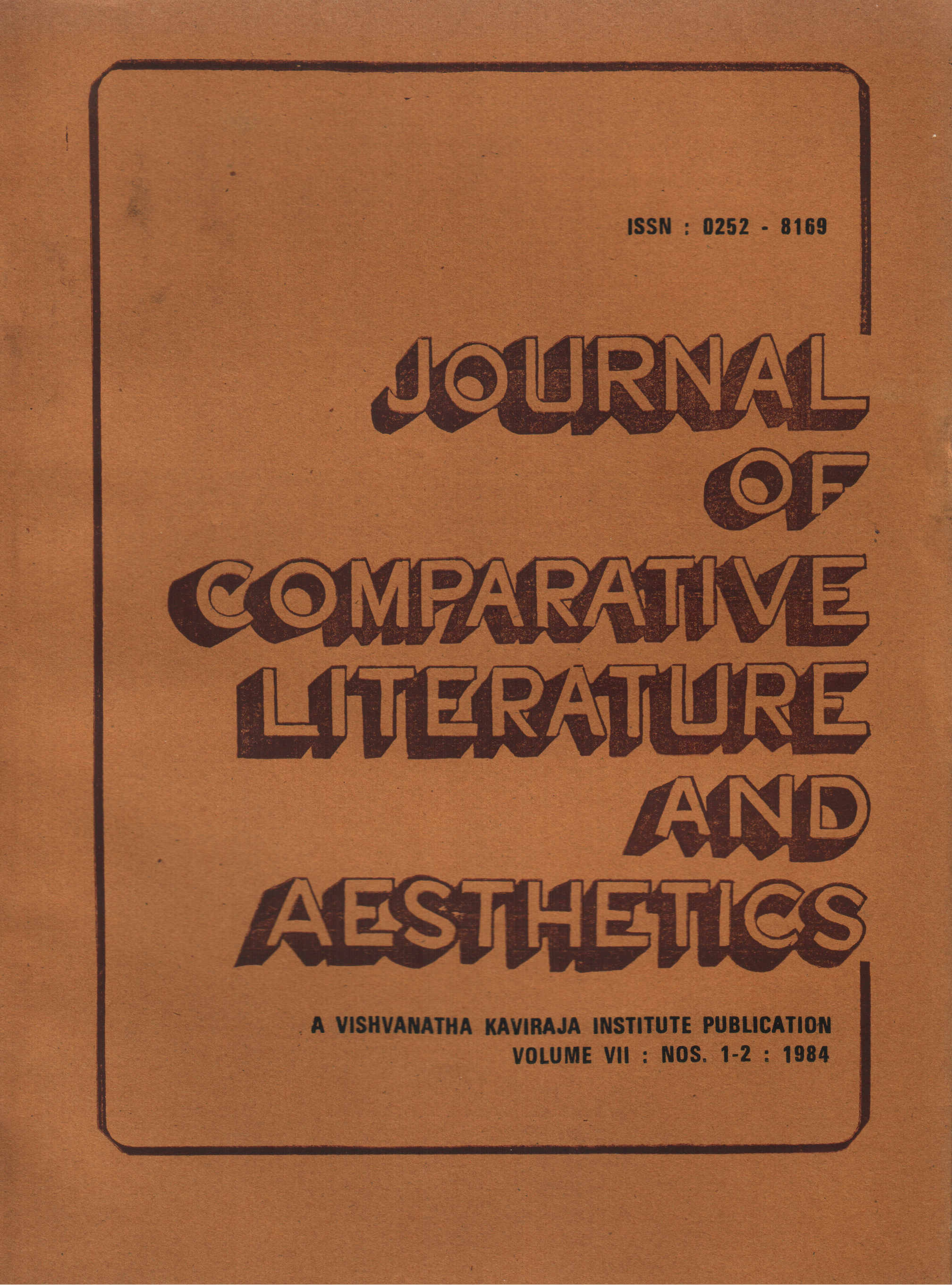
- Cover of the 1984 Issue
- Discipline: Comparative Literature, Philosophy, Aesthetics, Art History, Literary Criticism
- Language: English
- Edited by: Various, previously Ananta Charan Sukla

Publication details
- History: 1977–present
- Publisher: Vishvanatha Kaviraja Institute of Comparative Literature and Aesthetics (India)
- Frequency: Quarterly

Standard abbreviations
- ISO 4: J. Comp. Lit. Aesthet.

Indexing
- ISSN: 0252-8169
- OCLC no.: 8714643

Links
- Journal homepage; Online Archives

The Journal of Comparative Literature and Aesthetics (also known as JCLA) is a quarterly peer-reviewed journal published from India in the field of literature, philosophy, religion, and art history. The journal, published by Vishvanatha Kaviraja Institute of Comparative Literature and Aesthetics since 1977 as its official organ, addresses interdisciplinary and cross-cultural issues in literary understanding and interpretation, aesthetic theories, conceptual analysis of art, literature, philosophy, religion, mythology, history of ideas, literary theory, history, and criticism. It publishes essays and book reviews ranging across the literary and philosophical traditions of the East and the West. The institute, which publishes the journal and also academic books, was founded on 22 August 1977 coinciding with the birth centenary of legendary philosopher, aesthetician, and historian of Indian art, Ananda K. Coomaraswamy (1877-1947). Both the Institute and the journal were founded by Late Ananta Charan Sukla (1942-2020), a former professor of English and Comparative Literature at Sambalpur University, India. It is the oldest journal of India in the field of literature and philosophy which is still active, sans any institutional support.

The journal has published articles by renowned scholars like Rene Wellek, Harold Osborne, John Hospers, John Fisher, Murray Krieger, Martin Bocco, Remo Ceserani, J.B. Vickery, Menachem Brinker, Milton Snoeyenbos, Mary Wiseman, Ronald Roblin, T.R. Martland, S.C. Sengupta, K.R.S. Iyengar, V.K. Chari, Charles Altieri, Peter Lamarque, Martin Jay, Jonathan Culler, Richard Shusterman, Robert Kraut, Terry Diffey, T.R. Quigley, R.B. Palmer, David Fenner, Keith Keating and G. L. Hagberg. Rene Wellek, Harold Osborne, Mircea Eliade, Monroe Beardsley, John Hospers, John Fisher, Meyer Abrams and John Boulton have served on the editorial board of the Journal.

The journal is indexed and abstracted in the MLA International Bibliography, Master List of Periodicals (USA), Ulrich's Directory of Periodicals, Publons, The Philosopher's Index, WorldCat Directory, The York Research Database, ERIH PLUS, CrossRef, JSTOR, EBSCOhost, ProQuest, HathiTrust, UGC InflibNet, ACLA, and Gale (Cengage Learning), United States Library of Congress, and the British Library. The journal is also indexed in numerous university (central) libraries, state and public libraries, and scholarly organizations/ learned societies databases.

== Editorial board ==
The journal's editorial board has included notable scholars such as Terry Eagleton and Gayatri Chakravorty Spivak.
