= Ashta Nayika =

Eight types of heroines in Indian performing arts

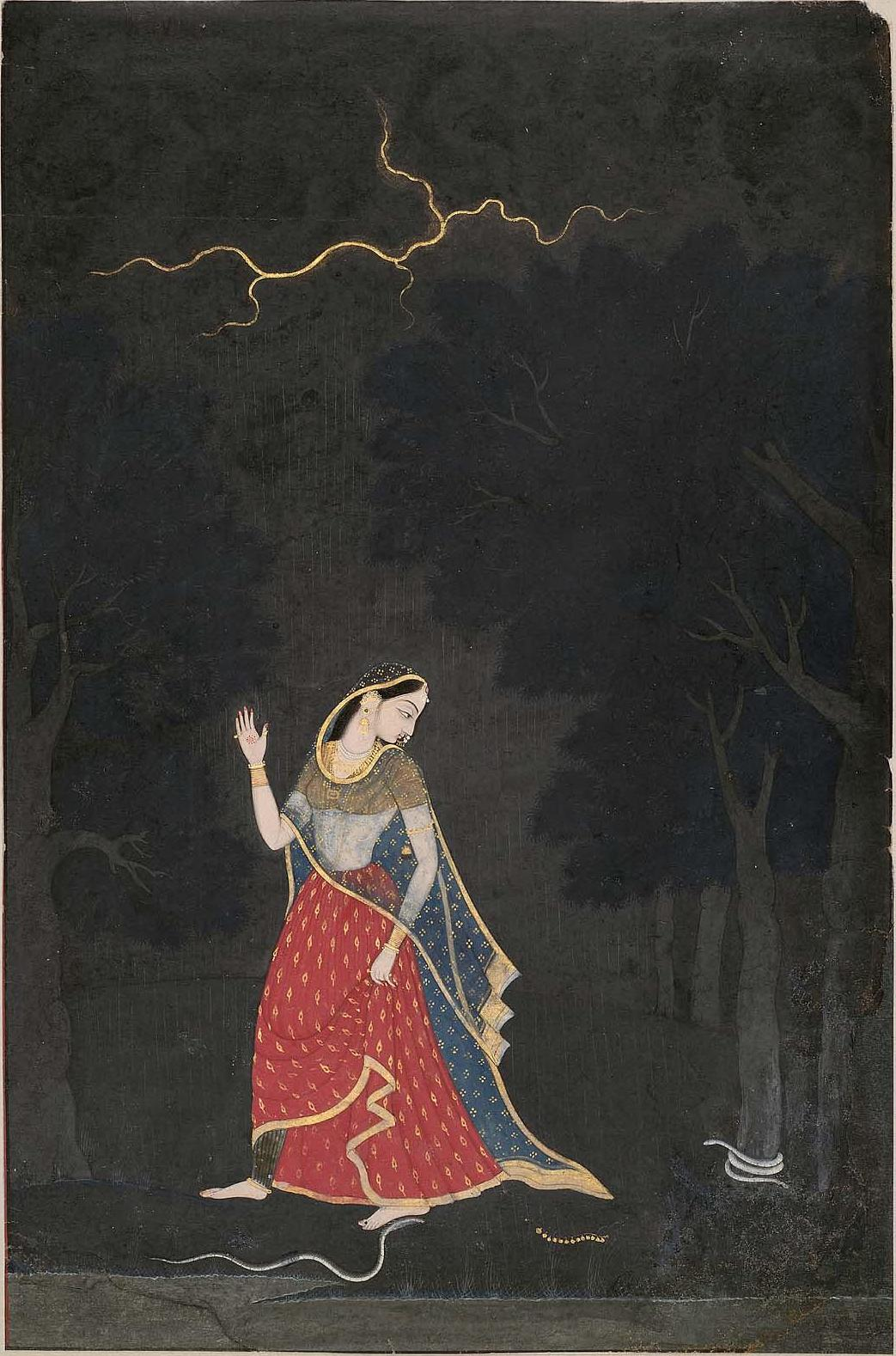
A painting by Mola Ram: Abhisarika nayika, "the heroine going to meet her lover". She turns back to look at a golden anklet, which has just fallen off. There are also snakes below and lightning above.

The Ashta-Nayika is a collective name for eight types of nayikas or heroines as classified by Bharata in his Sanskrit treatise on performing arts - Natya Shastra. The eight nayikas represent eight different states (avastha) in relationship to her hero or nayaka. As archetypal states of the romantic heroine, it has been used as theme in Indian painting, literature, sculpture as well as Indian classical dance and music.

== Nayikas ==
As per Ashta Nayika, there are eight nayikas.

#	Name	Sanskrit name	Meaning
1	Vasakasajja Nayika	वासकसज्जा नायिका	One dressed up for union
2	Virahotkanthita Nayika	विरहोत्कंठिता नायिका	One distressed by separation
3	Svadhinabhartruka Nayika	स्वाधीनभर्तृका नायिका	One having her husband in subjection
4	Kalahantarita Nayika	कलहांतरिता नायिका	One separated by quarrel
5	Khandita Nayika	खंडिता नायिका	One enraged with her lover
6	Vipralabdha Nayika	विप्रलब्धा नायिका	One deceived by her lover
7	Proshitabhartrika Nayika	प्रोषितभर्तृका नायिका	One with a sojourning husband
8	Abhisarika Nayika	अभिसारिका नायिका	One going to meet her lover

== History and cultural depictions ==
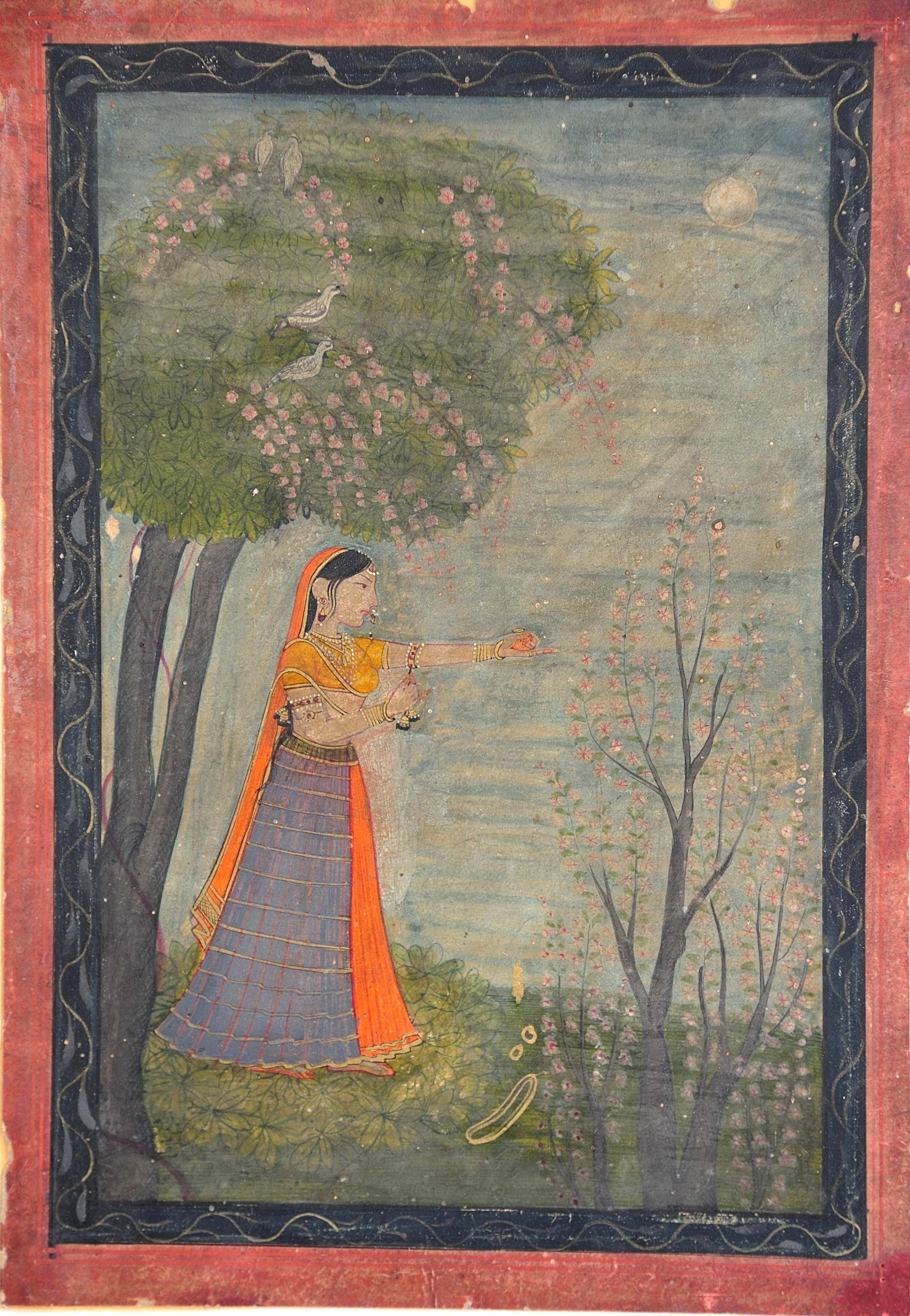
Vipralabdha throwing away her jewellery. Chamba, 18th-century. Salar Jung Museum

The Ashta-Nayika classification (nayika-bheda) first appears in Natya Shastra (24.210-11), a key Sanskrit treatise on Indian performing arts, authored by Bharata (dated between 2nd century BC and 2nd century AD). The classification is detailed in later works like the Dasarupaka (10th century), Sahityadarpana (14th century) and various other treatises on poetics as well as erotic Kamashastra texts like Kuttanimata (8th-9th century) based on courtesans, Panchasayaka, Anangaranga and Smaradipika. Keshavadasa's Rasikapriya (16th century) in Hindi, also elaborates on the Ashta-nayika.

The Ashta-Nayika have been illustrated in Indian painting, literature, sculpture as well as Indian classical dance, such as Kathak. Notable medieval paintings that depict the Ashta nayika are the Ragamala paintings, as those from the Bundi school of painting.

A famous example in Indian literature is Jayadeva's Gita Govinda (12th century) as well as in the Vaishnava poet Banamali's compositions, Radha dons the roles of the various nayikas while with her nayaka is the god Krishna.

The Ashta-Nayika is a central theme in Pahari embroidery used to decorate the Chamba Rumal, especially produced in Chamba, Himachal Pradesh. The Ashta Nayika are usually portrayed in eight panels on the Rumal.

In Indian (Hindustani) classical music, the eternal love between Radha and Krishna is represented through the consciousness of Radha as the leitmotif that dominates the lyrics. Especially the semi-classical genre of Thumri imbibes the myriad moods of Radha as Ashta Nayika consumed by passionate love for Krishna.

== The classification ==
The Natya Shastra describes the nayikas in the following order: Vasakasajja, Virahotkanthita, Svadhinabhartruka, Kalahantarita, Khandita, Vipralabdha, Proshitabhartruka and Abhisarika. The nayikas are further classified in two varieties of the shringara rasa, the rasa related to love: Sambhoga (love in meeting) and Vipralambha (love in separation). Vasakasajja, Svadhinabhartruka and Abhisarika are associated with Sambhoga; the others with Vipralabdha.

In the Shringara Prakasha, Bhoja relates the various nayakas and nayikas with musical ragas and raginis (a female raga). Somanatha's Ragavibodha (1609) and Damodara's Sangitadarpana (c. 1625) continue this trend.

=== Vasakasajja ===
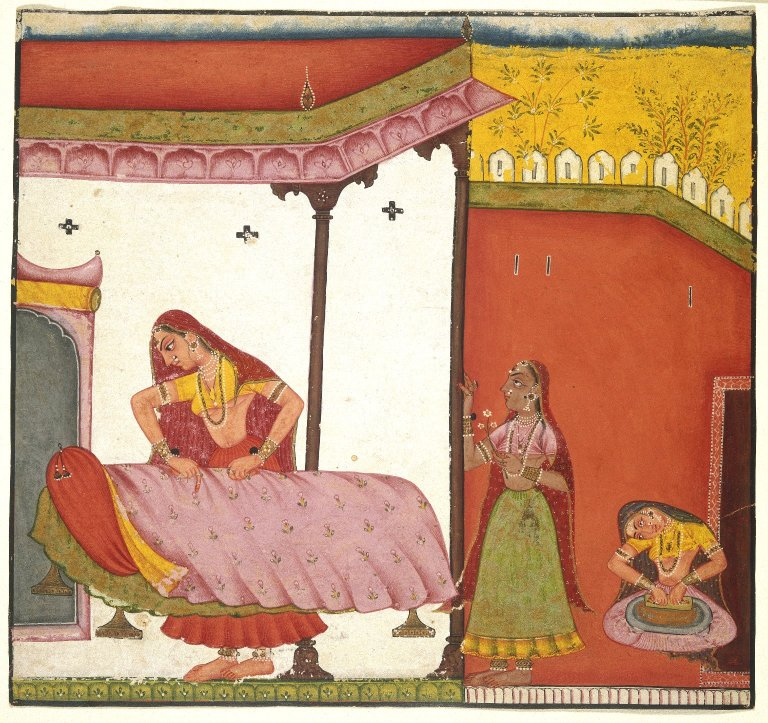
Vasakasajja readying the bed for a night with her lover

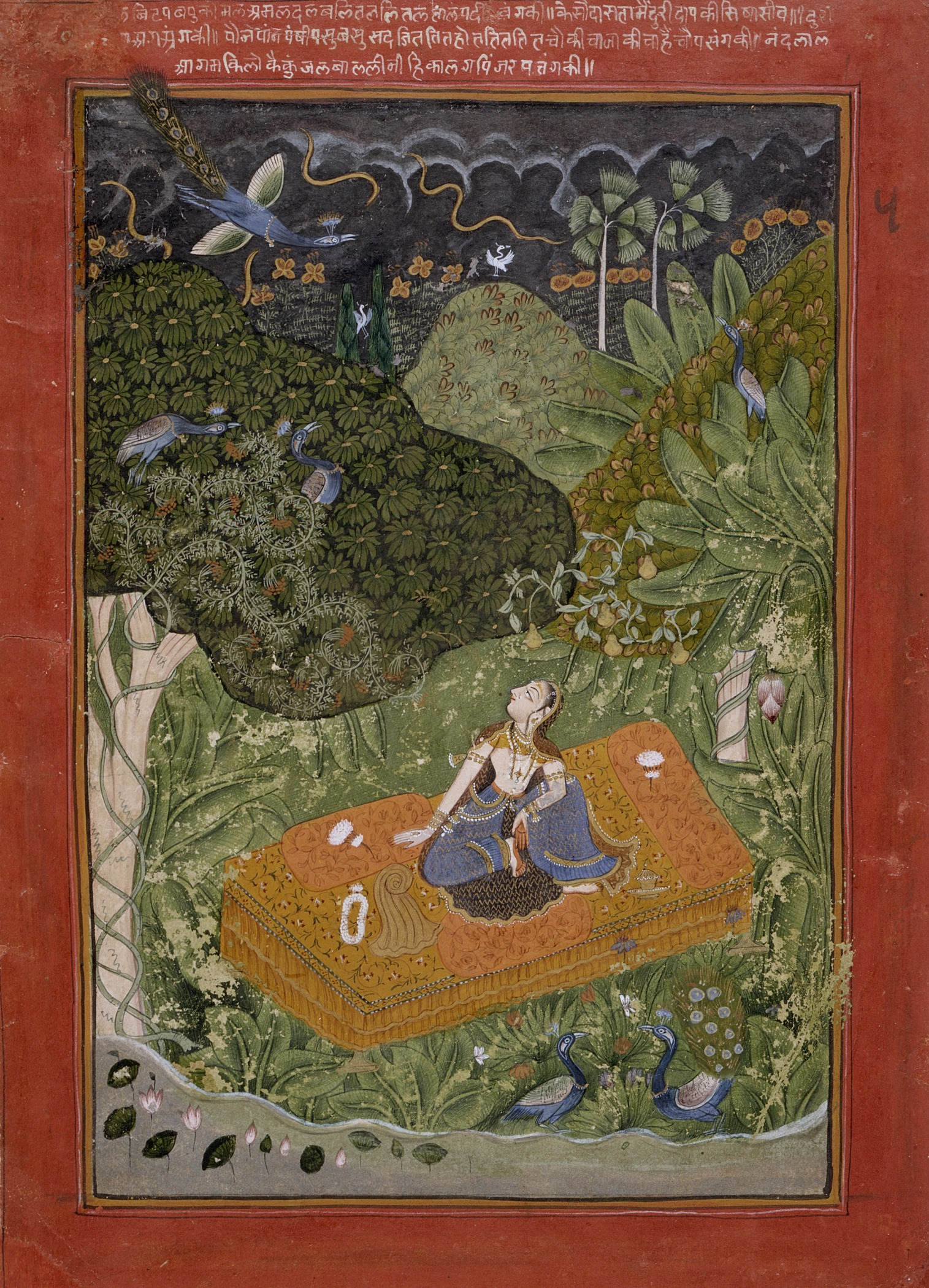
Virahotkanthita, waiting expecting her lover

Vasakasajja ("one dressed up for union") or Vasakasajjika is waiting for her lover returning from a long journey. She is depicted in her bed-chamber filled with lotus leaves and garlands. She is dressing herself for the union with her lover and "eager with expectation of love's pleasure". Her beauty is compared by Kesavadasa to Rati - the Hindu love goddess, waiting for her husband, the love god Kamadeva. A Vasakasajja sculpture is found in the Lakshmana Temple in Khajuraho and the National Museum, Delhi.

The Ragavibodha associates the raginis Bhupali and Todi with Vasakasajja.

=== Virahotkanthita ===
Virahotkanthita ("One distressed by separation") or Utka (as described by Keshavadasa) is the distressed heroine pining for her lover, who, due to his preoccupation, fails to return home. She is depicted waiting for him, sitting or standing on a bed or out in the pavilion.

The Ragavibodha identifies the raginis Mukhari, Pauravi and Turushkatodi with the Virahotkanthita, while the Sangitadarpana names Patamanjari in this category.

=== Svadhinabhartruka ===
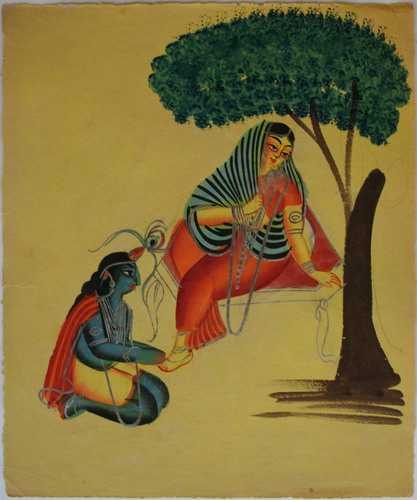
A Kalighat painting depicting Svadhinabhartruka with her lover applying mahawar to her feet

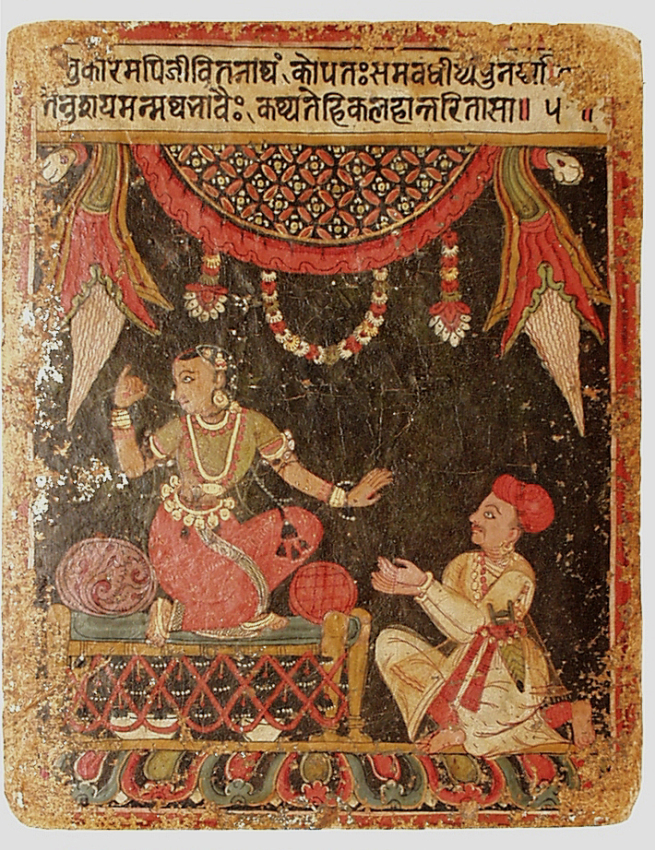
Kalahantarita refusing advances of a lover

Svadhinabhartruka ("one having her husband in subjection") or Svadhinapatika(as named by Keshavadasa) is the woman who is loved by her husband and controls him. He is subjugated by her intense love and pleasing qualities. He is devoted and faithful to her In paintings, this nayika is depicted with a nayaka, who applies mahawar on her feet or a vermilion tilak (mark) on her forehead. In Jayadeva's Gita Govinda as well as in the poem Kuru Yadunandana, Radha is portrayed as a Svadhinabhartruka. In the latter, Radha commands her lover, the god Krishna, to rearrange her makeup which is in disarray.

Many raginis like Malashri, Travanika, Ramakriti, Jaitashri and Purvi are associated with Svadhinabhartruka.

=== Kalahantarita ===
Kalahantarita ("one separated by quarrel") or Abhisandhita (as named by Keshavadasa) is a heroine separated from her lover due to a fight or jealousy or her own arrogance. Her lover is usually depicted leaving her apartment disheartened, while she too becomes heartsick and repentant without him. In other portrayals, she is depicted refusing the advances of her lover or refusing a wine cup from him. In Gita Govinda, Radha is also portrayed as Kalahantarita in an instance.

=== Khandita ===
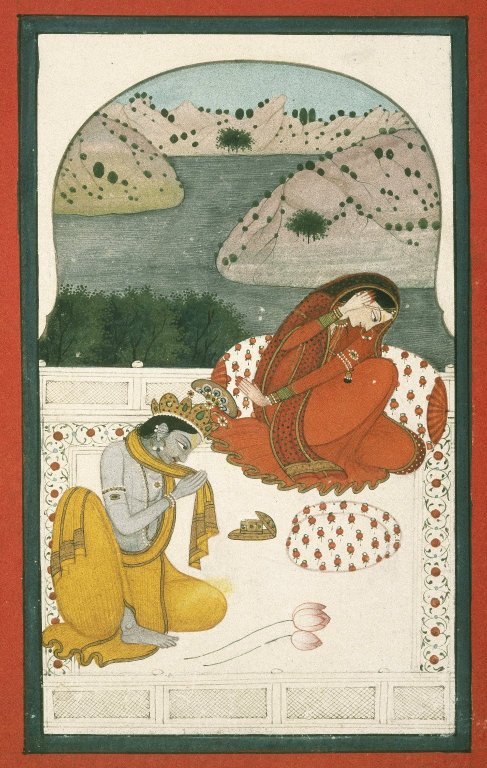
Khandita rebuking her lover.

Khandita ("one enraged with her lover") is an enraged heroine, whose lover had promised her to spend the night with her, but instead comes to her house the next morning after spending the night with another woman. She is depicted offended, rebuking her lover for his infidelity.

In the Sangitadarpana, the ragini Varati represents the Khandita Nayika.

=== Vipralabdha ===
Vipralabdha ("one deceived by her lover"), is a deceived heroine, who waited for her lover the whole night. She is depicted throwing away her jewellery as her lover did not keep his promise. This happens when a lover meets a Khandita and promises a tryst and breaks his promise.

The Sangitadarpana associates Vipralabdha with the ragini Bhupali. However, the Ragavibodha presents the raginis Varati and Velavati as Vipralabdhas.

=== Proshitabhartrika ===
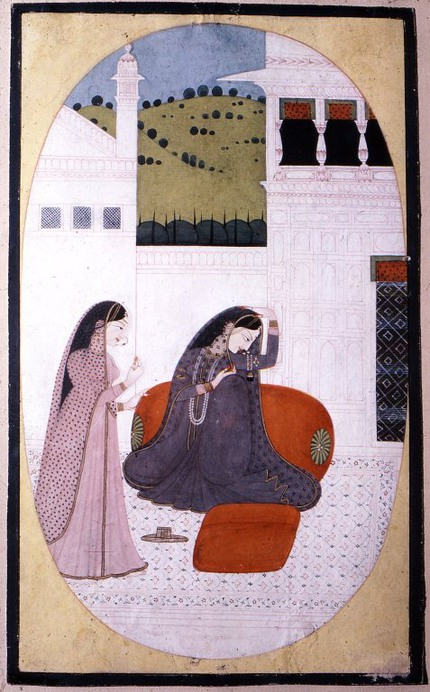
Proshita-patika mourning.

Proshitabhartrika ("one with a sojourning husband") or Proshitapatika (as named by Keshavadasa) is the woman whose husband has gone away from her for some business and does not return on the appointed day. She is depicted seated mourning, surrounded by her maids, but refusing to be consoled.

The Ragavibodha describes the raginis Dhanashri and Kamodi as Proshitabhartrukas.

=== Abhisarika ===
Abhisarika ("one who moves") is a heroine, who sets aside her modesty and moves out of her home to secretly meet her lover. She is depicted at the door of her house and on her way to the tryst, defying all kinds of difficulties like the storm, snakes and dangers of the forest. In art, Abhisarika is portrayed often in hurry towards her destination.

The raginis Bahuli and Saurashtri are described having the traits of the daring Abhisarika.

== In popular culture ==
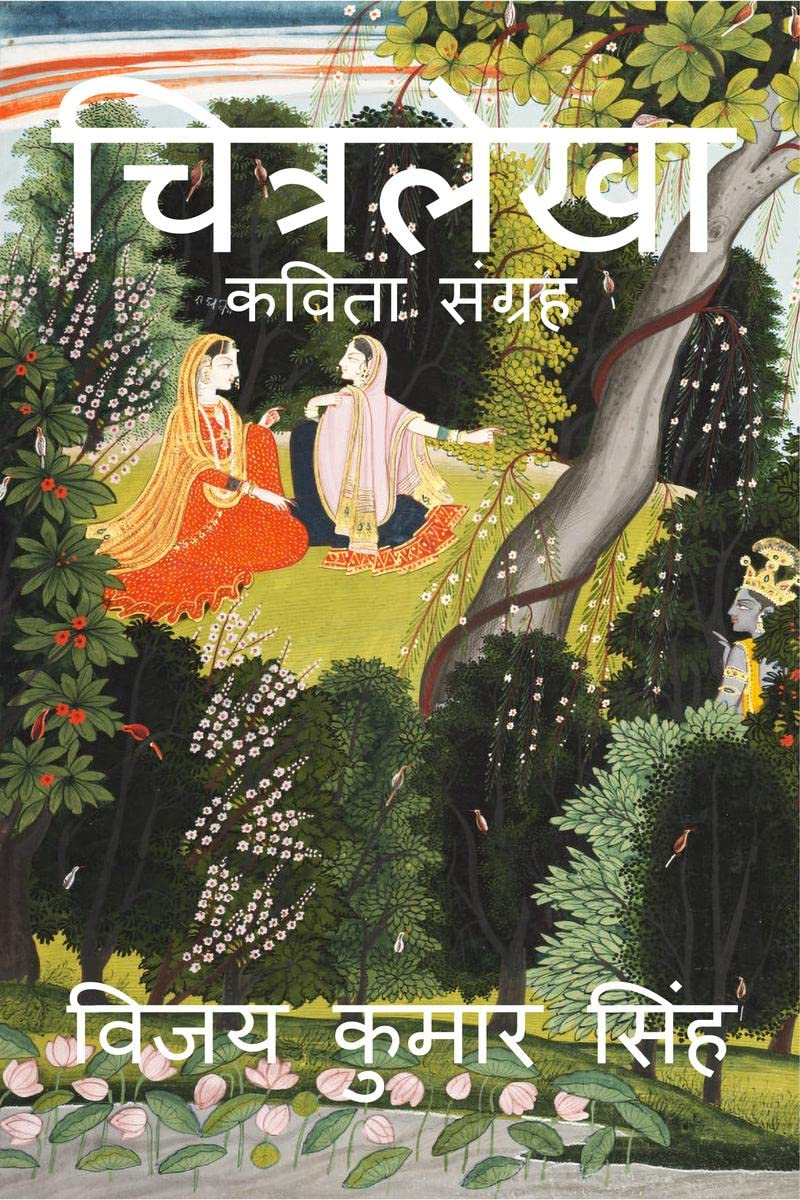
Book Cover for "Chitralekha" authored by Vijay Kumar Singh

The Ashta-Nayika have been relevant in contemporary works of art, literature, and poetry in India as well.

=== Poetry ===
- Vijay Kumar Singh's 2022 Hindi poetry collection "Chitralekha" has an entire section of 8 poems dedicated to the Ashta-Nayika. The 8 poems each have different Ashta-Nayikas as their protagonist and the individual poems are named after the different Ashta-Nayikas they are about.

== See also ==
- Nayak (disambiguation)
