= Achar (surname) =

Achar is an Indian surname. Notable people with the surname include:

- Chaithra J Achar, Indian actress
- Chandan Achar (born 1990), Indian actor
- G. Raghu Achar (Govindchar Raghu Achar, born 1978), Indian political activist
- Halappa Achar (born 1952), Indian politician
- Ramachandra Achar, Canadian engineer

== See also ==
- Acharya (surname)
- Acharia (disambiguation)
- Achari (surname)
