= Acharya (disambiguation) =

An acharya is a guide or instructor in religious matters.

Acharya or Aacharya may also refer to:

- Acharya (2022 film), a 2022 Indian Telugu film
- Aacharya (2006 film), a 2006 Indian Tamil film
- Acharya (Jainism), the head of an order of ascetics
- Acharya (moth), a genus of moths of the family Erebidae
- Acharya (surname), including a list of notable people with the name
- Acharya Institute of Technology, an Indian educational institution
- Acharya S (1960–2015), American Christ myth theorist
- T. G. Raghavachari, known by the pseudonym Acharya

== See also ==
- Acharia (disambiguation)
