= Meshta =

Meshta may refer to:

- Roselle (plant), also known as Meshta
- Meshta (community), also known as Meshta, a tribal community of Karnataka, India

== See also ==
- Meshta Helu, alternate transliteration of Mashta al-Helu, a town and resort in north-western Syria
