= K. Appukuttan Achary =

Artist, sculptor and painter from India

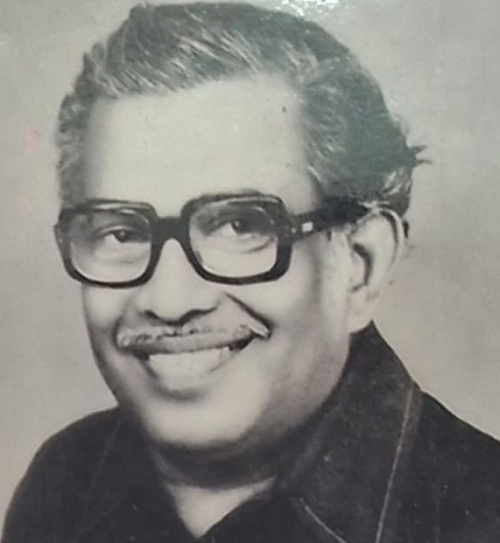
- Achary in 1980
- Born: 12 June 1925; Karikkakom, Kerala
- Died: 31 January 1997 (aged 71)
- Known for: Iconography, oil painting, wood sculptures
- Notable work: Chola Queen, Long Journey, Mother and Child
- Style: Traditional, modernist, abstract
- Awards: National Award for Ivory Carving in 1965, eight State Awards from Karnataka and Kerala States for Sculpture and Painting in 1962, 1963, 1964, 1966, 1969, 1970 and 1978

Kesavan Appukuttan Achary (12 June 1925 – 31 January 1997), known as Appu, was an Indian painter and sculptor and one of the pioneers of the Indian modernist art movement in Bengaluru. Appukuttan had the rare distinction of being one of the few Indian artists with mastery over both sculpting and painting. He won national acclaim for his ivory sculpting, becoming one of the youngest persons to receive the National Award for master craftsmanship in ivory carving for his work, Chola Queen, in 1965. He won a number of Lalitha Kala Akademi awards for his work across classical and modern painting and sculptures. His versatility is evident in the mediums he worked with and the range of his subjects. He drew sketches with ink. He painted using a palette knife to produce rich broad strokes. He sculpted with stone, wood and ivory. He modelled with cement. A number of his ink drawings have been included in Pratima Kosha - an encyclopedia of Indian iconography - published in VI volumes by the scholar Professor S.K. Ramachandra Rao and published by the Kalpataru Research Academy. Appukuttan's book, Rekha, a practical approach to traditional motifs and forms, was a result of his desire to share his vast knowledge and experience to others in the field of arts and crafts.

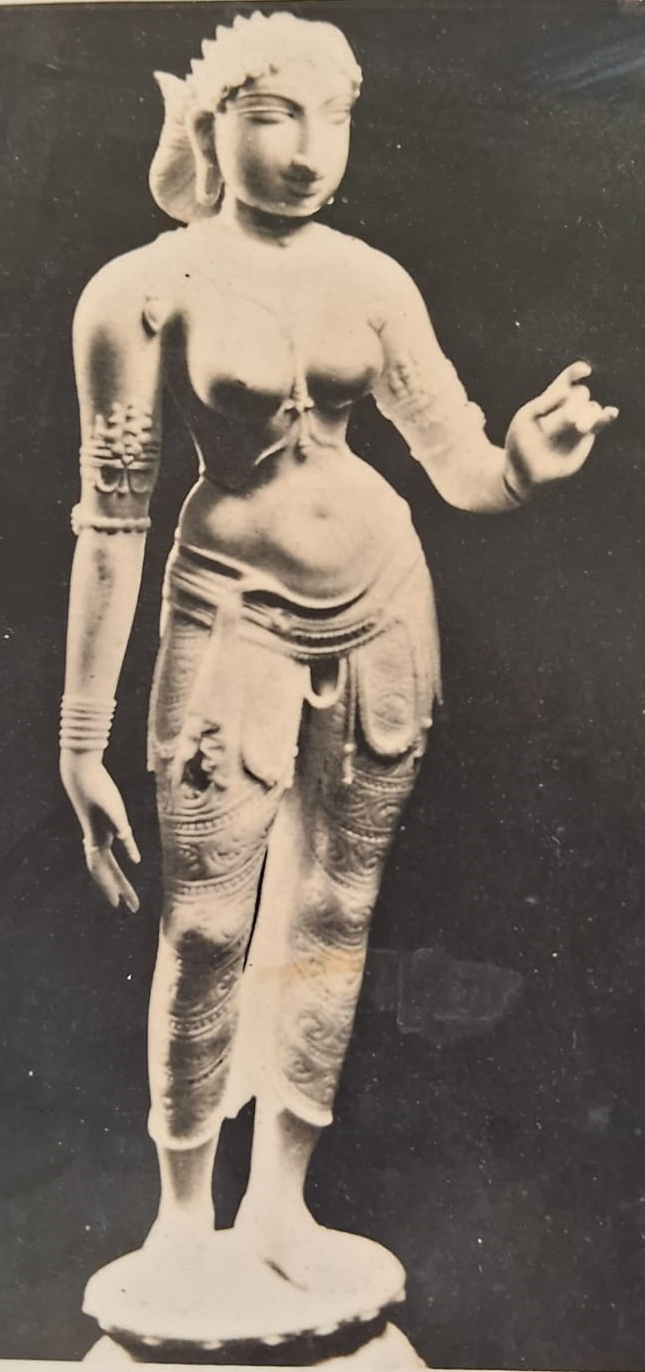
Ivory carving "Chola Queen" for which Appukuttan Achary received the National Award in 1965

Appukuttan's works - as a sketch artist, painter and sculptor - were rooted in traditional art but branched out to embrace modernism over time. His oil paintings are expressionist, sometimes bordering on abstraction. Some of his wood sculptures have drawn comparison with the works of Henry Moore. As a craftsman he was totally traditional; as an artist he was free of tradition. He was attracted to modern art for the freedom of expression that it afforded him. He is one of the few artists who was able to balance the traditional side of his creativity with the modern.

Besides being a prolific artist on paper and canvas, and a sculptor using various mediums, Appukuttan Achary wrote in various journals and periodicals, and also scripts for dramas.

== Early life and family ==
Appukuttan Achary was born on 12 June 1925 at Karikkakom in Thiruvananthapuram District of Kerala, India, into a family of artists, sculptors, dramatists and musicians of the 'Achary' community of Kerala. The Achary community of Kerala are craftsmen who excel in carpentry, woodcarving, ivory carving and temple design. They claim descent from Vishwakarma, the divine architect of the gods. He inherited a cherished legacy of generations of craftsmanship. It was, therefore, only natural that he be proficient at traditional arts. He had a general education at a local school and learnt wood carving and sculpting from his father, Kochappi Achary, a well-known sculptor and a musician.

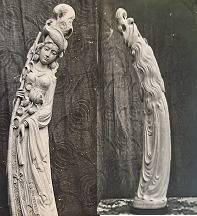
Front and back view of ivory carving "Japanese Lady" created in 1986

When he was 16 and had successfully completed school, his uncle, Ramankutty Achary, a well-known ivory sculptor, introduced him to carving in that most delicate of mediums - ivory.

Appukuttan joined the Rama Varma Drawing and Painting Institute at Thiruvananthapuram to learn the essentials of form and line in drawing. The rhythm and fluid expression for which Appukuttan's work became known can be traced to the short period at the Institute. He completed the course in crafts for the Madras Government Technical Examinations. While the artistic environment he grew up in helped initiate him to the traditional field of art and craft, his student days at the Rama Varma Institute - where he studied drawing and painting - strengthened his academic base and honed his native talent. This phase probably laid the foundation for, and gave him the courage to branch out into, the abstract and modernist idiom. Speaking about this phase in his life, Appukuttan said:

"It is absolutely essential to have a command over the medium that you have chosen. I believe a strong academic background is a must for artists. Thorough knowledge of technique and a clear understanding of the history of art through formal education are vital prerequisites for any artist. I grew up in a family where drawing and carving were common. My father was popular for his temple designs and carvings in the traditional idiom. In the circumstances, I could have ended up as just another talented craftsman. But a rebellious zeal to break new ground and a need to do something original and meaningful resulted in my becoming a creative artist."

== Artistic career ==
After his stint at the Rama Varma Drawing and Painting Institute in Thiruvananthapuram, Appukuttan joined the Ivory Manufacturing Centre in the same city to work as master-craftsman at its workshop. His years at the Centre were more in the nature of gaining experience. In 1958, All-India Handicrafts Board appointed the young artist as a master craftsman and artist of South Indian temple documentation in its Regional Design Centre at Bengaluru. His years at the Regional Design Centre gave him the necessary exposure to various craft forms and also helped him specialize in different crafts. He even taught image-making in wax to craftsmen of the manufacturing unit of Cauvery Handicrafts Emporium, during his stints there on deputation.

=== The style and subjects of his work ===
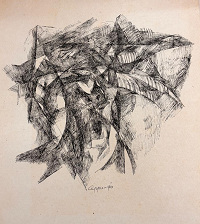
Ink drawing "Togetherness" created in 1990

Appukuttan's works, seen over time, show how his roots in classical styles formed the foundation for him to express himself in his later works in the modernist and abstract styles, fusing form and lines to convey the same messages in the depth that abstraction based on immense experience reveals.

Mythology, the life of the common man, the evils of the caste system, and nature were at the heart of Appukuttan's works. The helpless, the downtrodden and the pitiably wretched were subjects close to his heart. He portrayed not just the bright side of life but also the darker aspects of human existence. Pervasive melancholy suffuses some of his images and ideas. The repertoire of his works is visually loquacious, works drawn on deep wells of feelings, myth and metaphor.

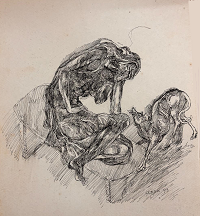
Ink drawing "Hunger" created in 1993

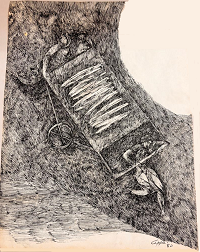
Ink drawing "Laboring" created in 1980

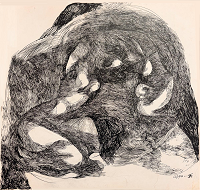
Ink drawing "Mother and Child" created in 1993

Appukuttan was a humanist, and the human was one of his dominant themes. To him the human figure was a vehicle of expression rather than a model. In his portrayal of the human situation, by and large, he took an optimistic view of life, emphasizing the happy, contented moments in daily life at home, on the wayside, and in the fields. It is not an ecstatic vision of life, but a mature and composed one. He acknowledged the inevitabilities of life, and being intensely in love with humans, when he depicted those aspects of life the result was heart-rending and poignant. The bonds that exist within the family - especially the most powerful bond that exists between a mother and her child - were central to many of his works.

His themes on the life of the common man are simple, everyday happenings in villages and towns, and come out vividly through his impressionistic abstracts. The harvest season, village folk hurrying to the market on a bullock-cart, the Kavadi festival and the bullfight are some of the works on village life. More than landscape or other natural themes, it was human figures that interested Appukuttan. His works are invariably full-figure compositions chosen from daily life such as laborers at work, street singers, fakirs, fishermen, bamboo fiddle vendors, musicians, etc.

Regarding his human subjects among the common people, Appukuttan said:

"These are real people. I feel deeply for them and sympathize with them. In that sense, these drawings are neither contrived nor meaningless essays."

Given his roots in traditional art, one of the distinctive features of all his works is the decorative design carried out with conspicuous skill. Appu improvised each work of his by the feeling of the moment to tell a spicy tale, at once moving, direct but yet impersonal in its appeal.

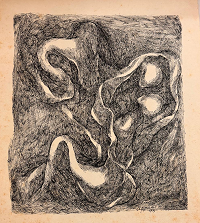
Ink drawing "Substance of Silence" created in 1993

Appu's works symbolize restraint and intelligent ideation blending harmoniously with a realistic technique. The onlooker is not confronted with any puzzling phenomenon and the subject of his art is transparent and eloquent in its expression and theme. There is no nonchalant splash and flourish of loud colors in his oil paintings. The whole technique is gentle, expressive, clear and subdued. His complex, multi-faceted sensibility immediately and consistently draws one to his works - be they paintings, sculptures in wood or models in cement. The diversity that it reveals - which is the source of vitality and essence of all major art - is a result of Appu's refusal to be bound by conventions. Like most modernists, Appu pursued an individualistic line of approach. His works reveal that he looked as much to mythology as to a sort of psychoanalysis for subject matter. Many of his works based on mythology depict a deeper and more general spirit of a myth as directly and dramatically as he can. There are others where his deeper understanding and interpretation of the symbols can be experienced by the viewer in the flux of hushed paint.

=== Ink drawings ===
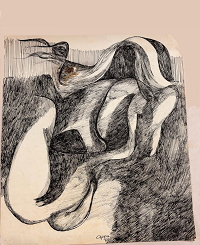
Ink drawing "Contours of Solitude" created in 1980

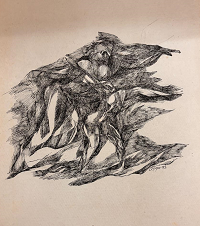
Ink drawing "Silent Roar" created in 1993

Drawing is the basis of all craftsmanship and Appukuttan Achary was a master of drawing. Appukuttan Achary, the craftsman, started from the point where artists like K.K. Hebbar left off. A majority of the drawings in the six volume Encyclopedia of Indian Iconography, Pratima Kosha, written by the scholar, Professor S.K. Ramachandra Rao, are by Appukuttan Achary.

Appukuttan considered good drawing the basis of good art and true to his conviction, underlying every painting and sculpture by him is draftsmanship of rare strength. His emphasis on draftsmanship did not make him a traditionalist. Rather, his idiom was very much modern. His distortions and streamlining of form, for instance, were always purposeful, serving to invest his subjects with a new meaning. Even when he abstracted, the overall recognizability in naturalistic shapes is not lost.

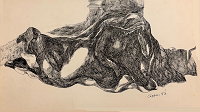
Ink drawing "Dream" created in 1993

In his foreword to Appukuttan Achary's book Rekha, the writer and art critic Krishna Chaitanya wrote:

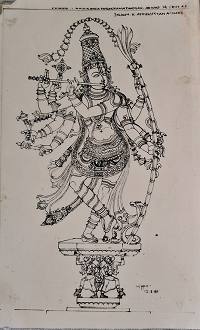
An ink drawing in the traditional style in 1980

"Our old architecture, especially the temples, are great treasure of forms with a surprising range of stylistic variety. A hieratic tradition, basically conservative, may preserve the icon through the centuries without much variation of the main contours of the form. But even there, the details vary considerably. Coronet and tiara, necklace and waist-band, bangle and anklet, are in many styles although they all may be equally decorative. Even a simple thing like a sacred thread can describe different rhythms, sweep in different undulations, over the torso. Systematically, Achary has given helpful guidance about the hidden measure and

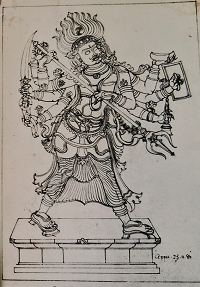
An ink drawing in the traditional style

geometry behind the sensuous incarnation of the iconic form, proceeded to the mudra or the gesture of the hands which in this country has become a very expressive language on its own, and then gone on to the hair styles, ornaments, etc. In the same helpful manner he has covered figurations of animals, foliar and other decorative motifs. A most valuable contribution is his series of drawings that bring out the distinctive stylistic qualities of a number of schools like the Chera, Chola, Pandya, Hoysala, etc. Though he has mainly confined himself to the traditional repertoire, his superbly simplified drawings indicate the creative mutation illustrated by his own artistic career and will enable others also to adopt traditional drawing for modernist sensibility without rupturing the links with our great heritage."

=== Oil paintings ===
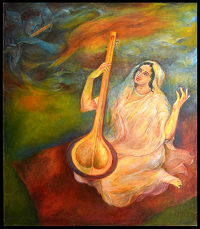
Oil painting "Meera" created in 1995

His oil paintings showed his remarkable versatility of subjects - figures, landscapes and abstract forms of line and color. His fine aesthetic sense is apparent in his color combinations, spacing and compositions. Appukuttan did not use the brush but, instead, used the palate knife. The strokes were bold and the colors bright. There is a harmonious blending of colors and objects in all his paintings, giving them a pleasing and natural effect. His canvases are distinguished by great feeling for colors in depth which contributes to their rich atmosphere. And his predilection for sober colors matches his mature vision of life.

=== Sculptures ===
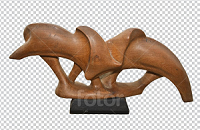
Wooden sculpture "Fighting Form" created in teak wood in 1971

Appu used his background in traditional craftsmanship to advantage to project the classical technique in a sophisticated idiom in the modern age. His technique had a flourish of foreign influence both in the motifs and treatment. His urge for creative art in the modern technique of wood carving enabled him to successfully break out from the traditional craftsmanship and iconographical mastery he inherited. His sculpture pieces are a combination of intense vitality and serene, lofty dignity. He was more interested in the art of human quality than the formal style of religious sculpture. His sculptural pieces delineate the essential form demanded by a particular subject, and the form is imaginatively conceived and elegant.

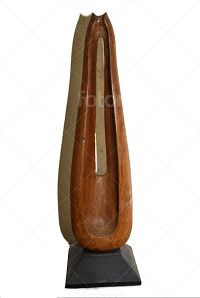
Wooden sculpture "Victory" created in teak wood in 1981

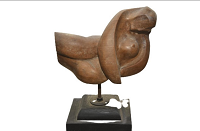
Wooden sculpture "Ardhanareshwar" created in teak wood in 1983

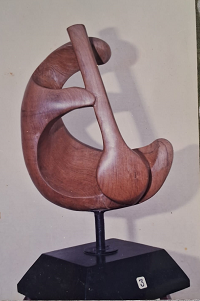
Wooden sculpture "Musician" created in 1980

As a sculptor, Appukuttan Achary worked on wood, ivory and stone, exploring sinuous forms with smooth, sensuous lines. Appukuttan's works showcase the natural beauty of his raw materials and are a testament to his sculpting prowess. Visualization and drawing, which were also his strong points, come to the fore in the smooth-contoured wood sculptures. The sculptures exude an enticing lyricism that speaks of Appukuttan's facility with the medium and his unerring eye for form. He utilized the striations in the wood to suit the respective parts of the body that he wished to depict. He made interesting use of the grains and texture of the wood to enhance the form and give substance to his creativity. His sculptures in wood have that rhythmic vitality that is apparent in all fine sculpture. In some of them, one can still discern the human forms that are not distorted but made into a pattern which is itself a study of pure design. In largeness of conception, elegance of pose and perfection of finish, his figures in wood represent the best tradition in sculpture. The modelling is delicate, and they beam a sweetness of expression which is elevating. Each angle and curve melts into the other seductively proclaiming the artist's dexterity and sensitivity.

Concluding his book, Rekha, Appukuttan wrote:

"Though there are many differences in the styles peculiar to various dynastic periods or schools or sculptures, yet a discerning mind can see much basic similarity in all these styles, which goes to prove, as many things Indian, that a spring of unity runs through all diversity. This could perhaps be explained by saying that the sculptors of old, in our country, would have, just as the minstrels of Europe, wandered from Kingdom to Kingdom in search of employment and livelihood and that they had depicted in their works the tastes and realities as would please those whom they served."

== Influence ==
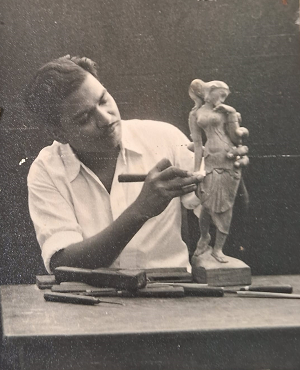
Appukuttan at work with a traditional sculpture in 1965

Appukuttan Achary was one of the artists instrumental - along with his contemporaries like Yusuf Arakkal, S. G. Vasudev, K. Janardanan, Balan Nambiar, V. G. Andani. - in establishing the modern art movement in Bengaluru. Like Appukuttan, many of these artists moved into Bengaluru from other cities and towns in India.

In addition to his works, Appukuttan contributed to the enrichment of the world of Indian art and craft in various ways:

- He served as an Adviser to the Handicrafts Design Development Centre Committee in Karnataka and as a Member of the National Award State Selection Board
- He published articles about design and crafts in various periodicals and journals
- He took part in a number of successful plays in Malayalam and also wrote short stories and plays in that language.
- A number of his ink drawings have been included in Pratima Kosha, an encyclopedia of Indian Iconography -published in VI volumes by Professor S.K.Ramachandra Rao and by the Kalpatharu Research Academy.
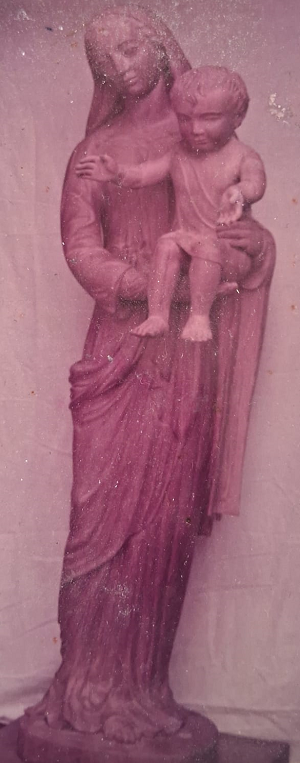
- Wooden sculpture "Mother Mary and Infant Jesus" at the St. Mary's Basilica, Bengaluru
  His book, Rekha, a practical approach to traditional Indian motifs and forms, was a result of his desire to share his vast knowledge and experience to others in the field of arts and crafts.
- He designed mementos and awards that were given to film stars at the Nostalgia festival.
- He contributed through art to increasing public awareness on civic issues. An eloquent colorful painting entitled Keep to the Left by him was displayed at an art exhibition to raise awareness on traffic rules.
- His paintings and carvings have been acquired by museums in Thiruvananthapuram, Bengaluru, Mumbai, New Delhi and Shimoga.
- His works have been collected by many Indian European and American admirers - including art collectors from the US, UK, France, Denmark, Belgium, West Germany, Australia, Switzerland, Canada, USSR, Sweden, East Africa, New Zealand, etc.
- Some of the prominent places where his works have been displayed in Bengaluru include: the St. Mary's Basalica (statue of Mother Mary and Infant Jesus); the residence of the Governor of Karnataka, the Raj Bhavan; and the entrance to the Bangalore Turf Club (galloping horses in bronze)
- He submitted a paper on the subject "Traditional and Contemporary Craftspersons of South India" in the seminar organized by the Central and State Lalitha Kala Akademis in Bengaluru, Chennai and Kerala.
- He wrote a number of articles about wood carvings and designing and published in periodicals of regional language.
- He was vice-chairman of the Craft Council of Karnataka
- He addressed the South Indian Wood Carvers Demonstration Camp organized by the Crafts Council of Karnataka at Bengaluru in 1992 about the techniques and tradition of wood carving.
- He conducted demonstration and lecture class for the craftsmen in the State Government Design Centre, Thiruvananthapuram
- He received an offer in 1987 as Advisor for Handicrafts, Malawi from the Commonwealth Secretariate, London but could not accept due to personal reasons.
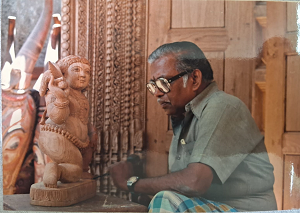
- Appukuttan at work with traditional wooden sculpture in 1982
  He was featured in a documentary film by Vision India for the television series "Face in the Crowd" by Delhi Doordarshan

In his Afterword to Appukuttan's book, Rekha, Chiranjiv Singh, the former Ambassador of India to UNESCO in Paris, wrote:

"Who can say in how many houses there are works by Appukuttan Achary unknown to the owners of those works. No record exists of his works and they are scattered in India and abroad. He did not get the recognition and acclaim that he deserved because he did not seek publicity. He worked quietly in the design centre and let his work speak for itself. He was far from self-promotion, which takes many a lesser talent far in the arts' world."

At the time of Appukuttan Achary's voluntary retirement, on the certificate issued by the Regional Design and Technical Development Center (Tech. Wing), Office of the Development Commissioner (Handicrafts), C. G. Aiyappa, Deputy Director (W & I), Government of India, Ministry of Commerce, wrote:

"He has been one of the most eminent Mastercraftsman, who had the ability of documenting the ancient traditional carvings of Southern Temples. His contribution of documentation and creation of designs will remain in the Centre as a significant mark of progress for ever to be remembered and as a light of guidance for the up-coming craftsmen generation."

== Awards ==
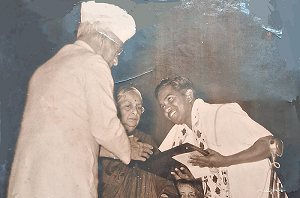
K. Appukuttan Achary receiving the National Award from President Dr. Radhakrishnan for his ivory carving "Chola Queen" in 1965

In 1965, Appukuttan Achary received the National Award for ivory carving for his work, Chola Queen. At forty, Appukuttan was one of the youngest of the national award winners.

He has won several awards from the Karnataka (formerly known as Mysore) State Lalit Kala Academy for paintings and sculpture. They were:

- 1962 - Mysore State Lalit Kala Akademi Art Exhibition for Oil Painting for the work "Long Journey"
- 1963 - Mysore State Lalit Kala Akademi Art Exhibition for Sculpture for the work "Head of Lord Shiva"
- 1964 - Mysore State Lalit Kala Akademi Art Exhibition for Oil Painting for the work "A Vision"
- 1966 - Mysore State Lalit Kala Akademi Art Exhibition for Sculpture for the work "Harmony"
- 1966 - Mysore State Lalit Kala Akademi Art Exhibition for Oil Painting for the work "After the Bath"
- 1969 - Kerala State Lalit Kala Akademi Art Exhibition for Sculpture for the work "Family"
- 1970 - Kerala State Lalit Kala Akademi Art Exhibition for Oil Colour for the work "Men and Waves"
- 1978 - Kerala State Lalit Kala Akademi Art Exhibition for Sculpture for the work "Woman in Hollow Form" 1978

Besides the above awards, he received the:

- 1973 - Cochin Thuramugha Thozhilali Union Silver Jubilee for Oil Painting for the work "Heave-O-Heave"
- 1977 - Mysore Dasara Industrial and Cultural Exhibition for Oil Painting
- 1978 - The Hyderabad Art Society All India Exhibition for Sculpture for the work "Mother"
- Poet Kumaran Asan Centenary Art Exhibition Award for Painting
- Karnataka State Government Award for the best traditional craftsman

== Exhibitions ==
Throughout his life he participated in multiple one-man shows, group exhibitions and won many accolades, both at home and abroad.

=== Solo exhibitions ===
Appukuttan Achary's solo exhibitions include:

- Cosmopolitan Friendship Association, Vignana Bhavan School, Bengaluru, 17 December 1961
- Recent Works in Wood, on Canvas and on Paper, Max Mueller Bhavan, Bengaluru.
- Exhibition of Drawings, Paintings and Sculptures, Max Mueller Bhavan, Bengaluru, 3 to 18 September 1965.
- Exhibition of Paintings & Wood Sculptures, All India Fine Arts & Crafts Society Hall, New Delhi, 8 to 14 November 1969.
- Exhibition of Paintings and Sculptures, Modern Wood Crafts, Bengaluru, May 1971.
- Exhibition of Paintings and Wood Sculpture, Gallery Oasis, Mumbai, 24 February to 5 March 1972.
- An Exhibition of Sculptures, Paintings and Drawings, Alliance Francaise, Bengaluru.
- An Exhibition of Paintings and Sculptures, Max Mueller Bhavan, Bengaluru
- Exhibition on Traffic Rules, Ravindra Kalakshetra, Bengaluru, 10 to 15 May 1971.
- Painting and Sculptures Exhibition, Cane and Bamboo, Chennai

=== International exhibitions ===
Some of Appukuttan Achary's international exhibitions were:

- Sculpture Exhibition sponsored by Max Mueller Bhavan, Suriya Gallery, Frankfurt, West Germany
- Paintings and Sculptures Exhibition, Nataraja Gallery, Austin, Texas, USA
- Paintings Exhibition, South India Cultural Exchange Program in multiple places in the USSR

=== Group exhibitions ===
Some of the group exhibitions that Appukuttan Achary participated in were:

- Exhibition of Oil Paintings (Roshni Modayil) and Wood Sculptures (Appukuttan Achary), Visvesvaraya Industrial Trade Centre, Bengaluru, 14 August 1971.
- Mysore Dasara Industrial & Cultural Exhibition. Artists: K. Appukuttan Achary, Y.H. Sugur, B. H. Ramachandra, V.B. Hiregouder, T.V. Ganeshgudi, K.V. Seetharaman, G.L. Narasimhan, E.K. Janardanan, 1977
- Pioneering Contemporaries Karnataka, Group Exhibition with (Late) K Appukuttan Achary, Balan Nambiar, VG Andani, Bhaskar Rao, Chandranath Acharya, C Chandrashekara, (Late) RM Hadpad, Jasu Rawal, Kande Rao, Krishna Setty, PS Kumar, JMS Mani, Marishamachar, Milind Nayak, Munoli, Peter Lewis, Pushpa Dravid, Ramdas Adyantaya, Ramesh Rao, (Late) GS Shenoy, SG Vasudev, Yusuf Arakkal, Gallerie De Arts, Bengaluru, 15 Feb 2011

== Gallery ==
=== Ink drawings ===
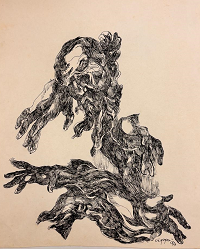
Ink drawing "The Search of the Blind" created in 1994

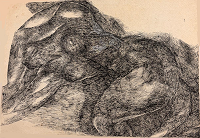
Ink drawing "Nude" created in 1993

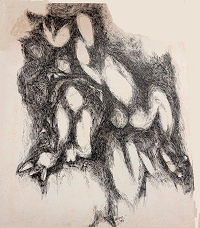
Ink drawing "Sleeping" created in 1994

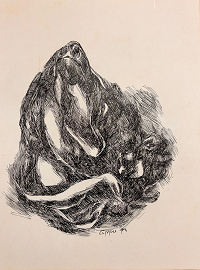
Ink drawing "Mother and Child" created in 1994

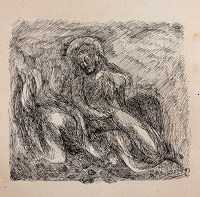
Ink drawing "Anointing the Feet of Jesus" created in 1993

Some of Appukuttan Achary's ink drawings include:

Becoming (1979), Laboring (1980), Contours of Solitude (1980), Togetherness (1990), Anointing the Feet of Jesus (1993), Dream (1993), Holy Eucharist (1993), Hunger (1993), Mother and Child 1 (1993), Nude (1993), Silent Roar (1993), Substance of Silence (1993), Sleeping (1994), Search of The Blind (1994), Mother and Child 2 (1994), Thala and Laya, Unbearable, Save Me, Empty Life, Gangothri

=== Sculptures ===
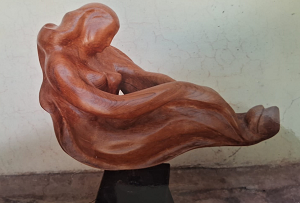
Wooden sculpture "Ganga"

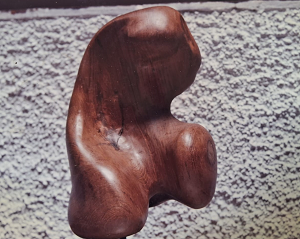
Wooden Sculpture "Seated Woman"

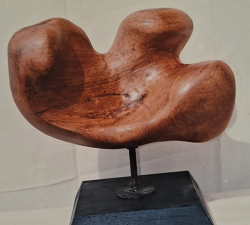
Wooden sculpture "Reclining Woman"

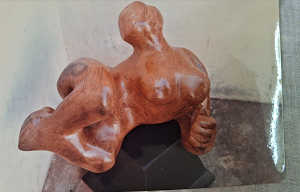
Wooden sculpture "Reclining Woman"

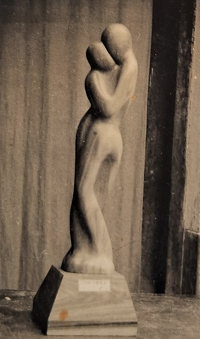
Wooden sculpture "Embrace"

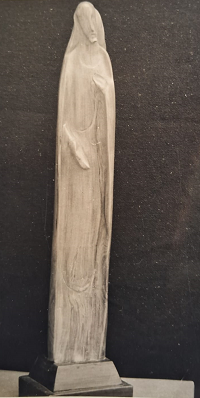
Wooden sculpture of "Christ"

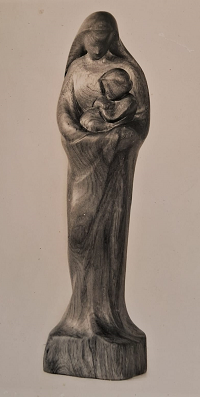
Wooden sculpture "Madonna"

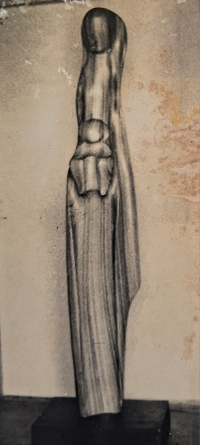
Wooden sculpture "Mother and Child"

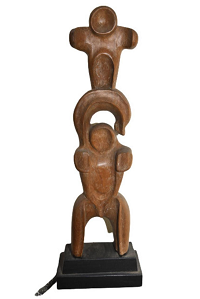
Wooden sculpture "Mother and Child"

Mother and Lovers and Female Torso are beautifully conceived and executed. The sculptures exude an enticing lyricism that speaks of Appukuttan's facility with the medium and his unerring eye for form. He utilizes the striations in the wood to suit the respective parts of the body that he wishes to depict.

Tambura Player and the Madonna and Child.

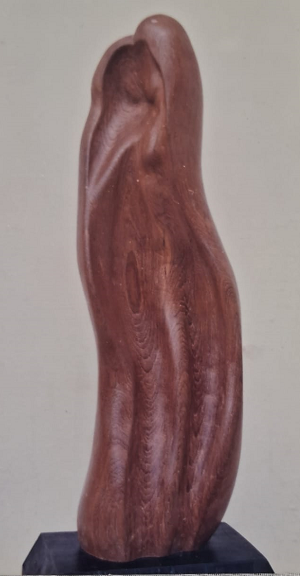
Wooden sculpture "Intimacy" created in teak wood in 1978

Namasthe, Embrace, Figure, Immersed, Kiss, Mother and Child 1, Mother and child 2, Mother and child (standing form), Mother and Daughter, Raga Madhuri (absorbed in music), Family, Shepherd, Surprise, Thinker, The Sky, Training, Woman.

Thumbura and Storm are in the abstract manner and are simply rhythmic shapes.

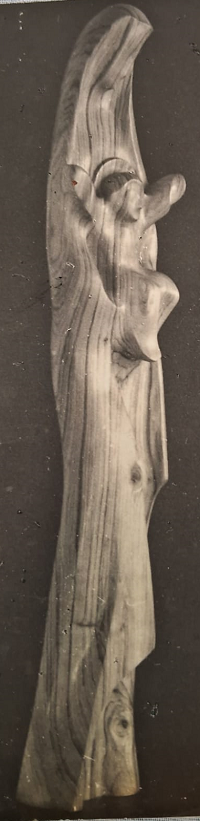
Wooden sculpture of "Mother Mary holding Infant Jesus near her womb"

Ardha Narisvara selected for Asian Fair in New Delhi 1973

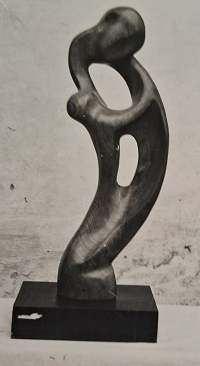
Wooden sculpture "Training" created in 1969

Training stands out as a remarkable study of a mother teaching her child to walk.

Among the sculptures, the one in cement of a Garden Maid and the wood sculpture of the Reclining Family are intricate in workmanship and richly suggestive.

Christ and Magdalene showing the artist's capacity to create eloquence out of dumb wood that heightens the effect. The same can be said of Shyness and Carry Me where a child beseeches to be picked up. Family No. 1, Family No. 2, Sweetness and Wonder suggest the truth whereby the viewer can perceive for himself the true nature of the subject.

The Family Elephant shows a man on four legs, carrying a child on his back, pretending to be an elephant. The carving showing a child inside the mother's womb. Family, showing father, mother and child, Madonna, mother and child, We Are One showing man and woman, Family Link, etc., are all done with care and imagination.

Family is an interesting composition with its three hollows echoing the basic motif.

Long Journey (left) combines form and grace. This won for him the first prize in the Lalit Kala Academy Exhibition in 1962. In contrast to this modernism in his work Shri Gowri in traditional style.

Tendrils, a pair of lovers. His two Madonnas, one slightly variant from the other in the position of the Holy Child.

Lady Sitting, Two Fingers - in rose-wood.

=== Oil paintings ===
Forms in the Mist and Knotted Human Relationship are interesting for their color schemes and composition.

Absorbed in Music, Blacksmith, Builders, Bhajan Singers, End of the Day, Family Group, Flame of Passion, Festive Fun, Folk Dance (Kolattam), Land, Sea and Sky, Reunion, Reclining Figures, Riverside Reveries, Siva, Spring, Space, The Flow, Village Well, Inspired.

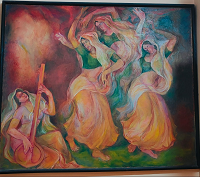
Oil painting "Spring" created in 1995

After the Bath 1 shows two nudes with a background of clothes in various colors hanging on a clothesline. The whole picture has a brilliant kaleidoscopic effect. His After the Bath 2 shows three seated nudes with the whole picture suffused with a golden orange glow that is a visual delight.

Melody shows a group of women dancing and playing musical instruments. The whole picture is painted in green with nuances of the same green color - a symphony of green - the rhythms of the lyrical lines convey the rhythm of the dancers and the music seems to seep through the picture - a melody of form and color.

The Dawn of Huts and Cityscape are painted in the early "tender" cubistic manner.

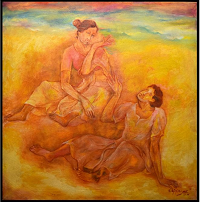
Oil painting "Chitchat" created in 1995

Dhruvangal (Poles) won the first prize in the Chiayinkil exhibition. The painting in oil is a scene from the poetic work Duravashtha (sad plight) of Kumaran Asan and shows Chathan, the low-caste worker and Savithri, the Nambudhri woman who happen to meet by force of circumstances and decide to live together breaking the shackles of caste.

Reception, Preparation, Feelings, Huts in Corner, Monuments of Memories, Peace on Earth, Childhood, Toilet, Blue Cathedral, Groping in Dark, Boulders, Ruins, Crucification, Mist, Hill Resort, Towards Peace, Still Life with Nude, Gossip, Steel Plant at Night, City Scape, Huts, Poverty, Immersed (Figure in Abstraction), Beggars in the Street, Her Treasure, Vision, Advice, Thoughts, Horizon, Problems, Mother and Child, Helper Woman, Psalm of Life, Fakir, Burden of Life, Pride of

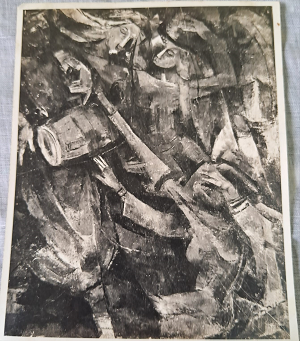
Oil painting "Musicians"

Labour, Awakening from Sleep, Lord and Life, Banana Seller, Lovers, Messenger, Union of Cosmic Principles, Fashion, Sisters, Nude in Black Curtain, Portrait Study, Forsaken Dwelling, Mohini, Expectation, Rhythm, The Eve, Divine Love, Folk Dance, Sisters, Life - a Boat Race, Family, Training (Max Mueller Bhavan, 13 to 18 September 1965)

Kavadiattam (Mysore Dasara Group Exhibition 1977)

Studies like Bhajan Singers, End of Day, and Builders are excellent examples of this individuality. While these stand out for their grace and distinction, themes like Flame of Passion, Spring, The Flow and such other canvases where the landscape gets an upper hand over the human figure embody a happy motive expressed with skill and

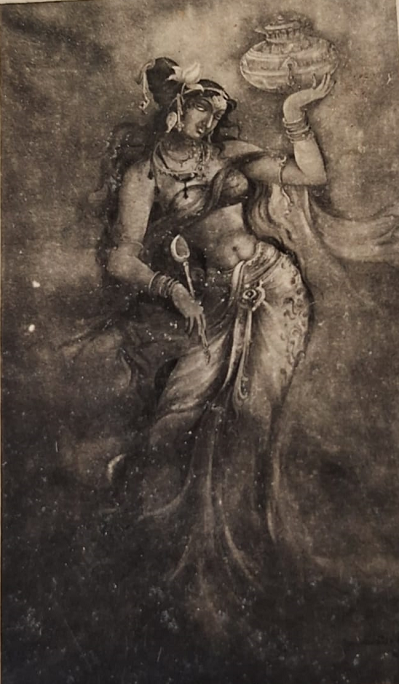
Oil painting "Goddess Kaveri"

spontaneity.

Her Treasure features a mother fondling her child and in Helper-Woman, an imaginatively treated portrait of a sweeper woman. The oils Mist and Hill Resort are works with a dominating blue atmosphere.

Inspired reveals an expressionist urge

Festival of Love depicting the joyous Holi singing and dancing. A theme from Sakunthalam, Sun God and The Light of the World are works bearing testimony to Appukuttan's excellence in portraiture and expressionism. A Rural Sunset and Seasons are landscapes rich in color-

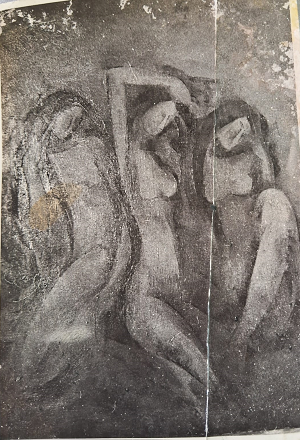
Oil painting "Nudes"

blend and execution.

Appu Kuttan's oil paintings contain two Nude Studies which bring out the charm of the feminine beauty. His painting entitled Affection portraying a cow and its calf licking each other is a picture of sheer naturalness and intense animal attachment.

The Bull-fight recalls the old tradition of Tamil Nadu where, during Pongal, the owner of the bull ties a bag of money to the horns of the bull, and the winning bullfighter gets the money and the owner's daughter in marriage.

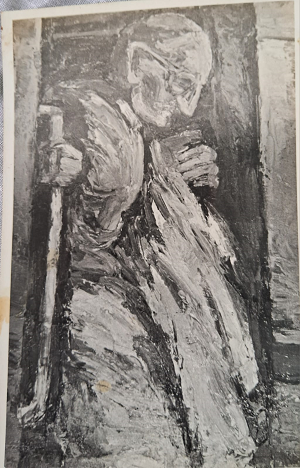
Oil painting "Bapu"

Pilgrims, Folk Dance, and the two studies of Bapu are excellent examples of this mood. The Spring, Mind Let Loose, Ignorance and to a lesser extent Youth are symbolic in approach. But they certainly succeed in bringing out the mood and the atmosphere effectively. But for sheer freshness and daintiness of coloring Holi and Mind Let Loose as also Fisherman in a limited sense must be mentioned.

Among his paintings mention may be made of Sitting Nude with its striking red against the blue and black creating a certain dramatic impress.

His Reward, oil color, presents a familiar theme, forcefully in a new approach.

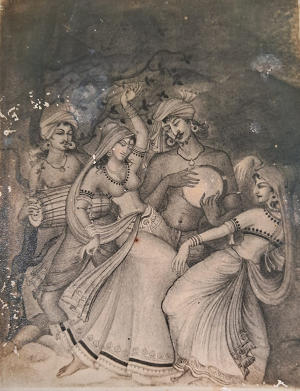
Oil painting in the traditional style

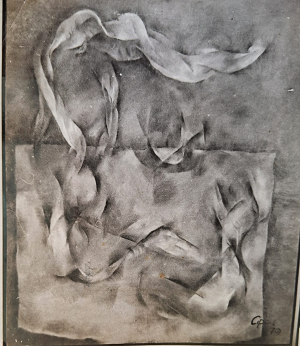
Oil painting in the abstract style

Throb of Love was a picture of a collection of vases with female forms, the artist in the background still busy fashioning them. It had a static, yet dynamic quality. Musician was a diagram of lines and circles, the theme figure identifiable only at a later glance. A superb composition of fishermen returning home with their nets (Way Back Home), details graphically filtered out, was in twilight tints. His other pictures like Reverie, Unity, etc., definitely followed in the wake of his sculpture.

Vanished Blue - The Departed Master, a reference to Pablo Picasso's Blue Period, delineated only in shades of blue and white, was Appukuttan Achary's tribute to the late Picasso. Picasso's famous Peace Dove framed his face, while his hands held a palette.

An colorful painting entitled Keep to the Left was part of the Exhibition on Road Rules to raise awareness on traffic rules.

== External links to news articles ==
- www.thehindu.com/features/metroplus/Art-and-the-city/article14513185.ece
- bangaloremirror.indiatimes.com/entertainment/lounge/contemporary-but-pioneers/articleshow/21676297.cms
- bangaloremirror.indiatimes.com/entertainment/lounge/poetry-from-the-heart/articleshow/21677648.cms
- www.deccanherald.com/india/karnataka/bengaluru/eye-catching-works-display-art-2184699
