= Ananta Charan Sukla =

Indian scholar (1942–2020)

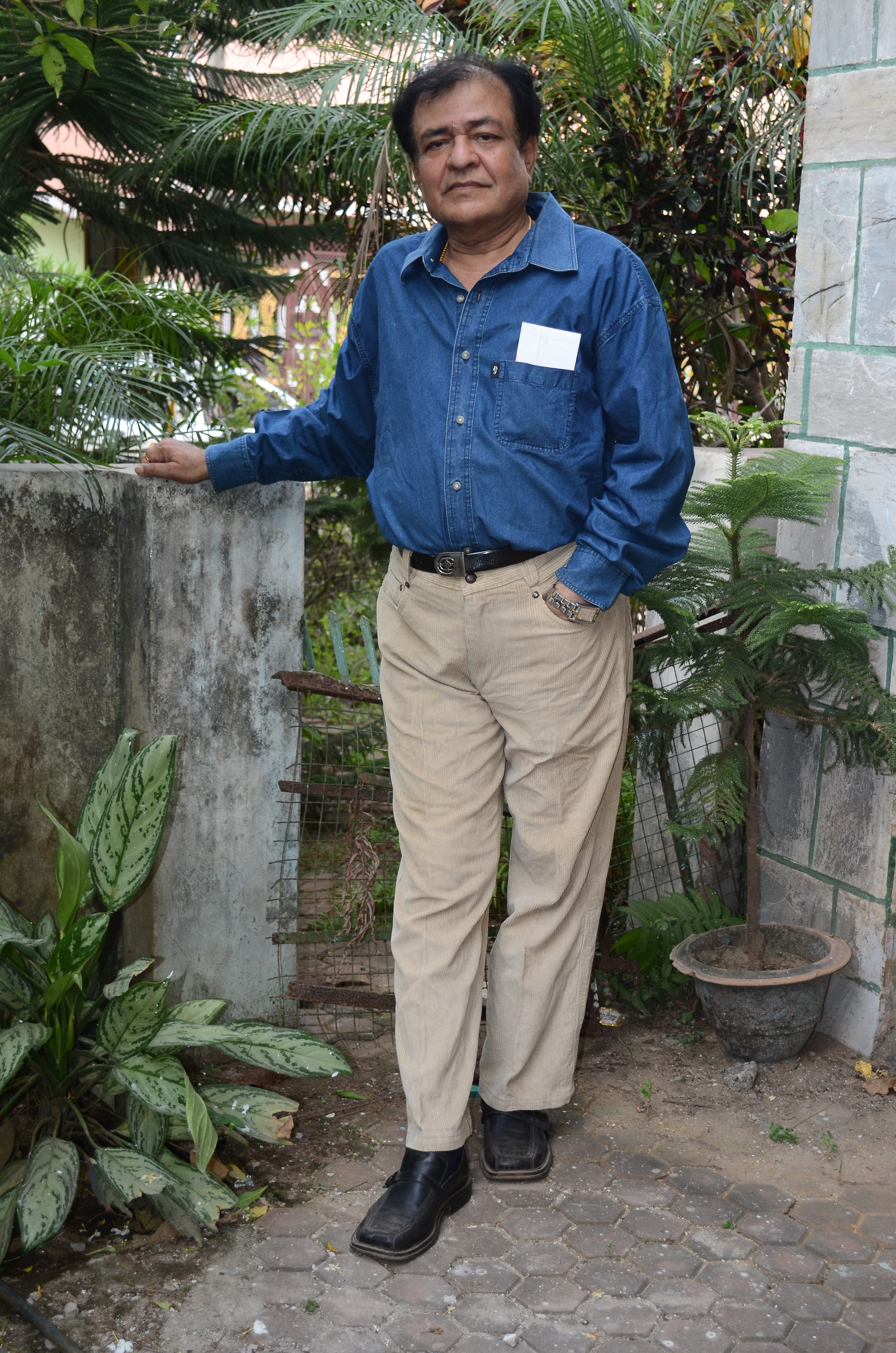
- Born: 6 November 1942; Garadpur, Bhadrak, Odisha, India
- Died: 30 September 2020 (aged 77); Cuttack, Odisha, India
- Education: Bhadrak College, Jadavpur University, Utkal University
- Occupations: Comparative philosopher of art and literature, Aesthetician, religious studies
- Known for: Comparative literature, aesthetics, literary criticism, philosophy, Sanskrit studies
- Spouse(s): Indulata Sukla, Former Professor of Mathematics, Sambalpur University, Sambalpur

Ananta Charan Sukla (also Ananta Ch. Sukla or A. C. Sukla; 6 November 1942 – 30 September 2020) was an Indian scholar of comparative literature, literary criticism, aesthetics, philosophy, and art history. He was the founding editor of Journal of Comparative Literature and Aesthetics and edited and published the journal for over 40 years. He specialized in comparative aesthetics (Sanskrit and Western), literary theory, philosophy of art, philosophy of literature, religion, mythology, and cultural studies. He was a professor of English and Comparative Literature at Sambalpur University, Sambalpur, Odisha.

== Biography ==
Sukla was born on 6 November 1942. He came from a remote village Garadpur, to the town of Bhadrak, where he attended Bhadrak College.

He then attended Jadavpur University, Calcutta, where he completed masters degrees in English, philosophy and Sanskrit, and then a PhD in comparative literature under professors Subodh Chandra Sengupta, Jagannath Chakravorty, and Sisir Kumar Chatterjee. He also attended Utkal University, Bhubaneswar. His doctoral thesis, The Concept of Imitation in Greek and Indian Aesthetics was submitted to Jadavpur University and was published by Rupa & Co., Calcutta in 1977.

Sukla died on 30 September 2020 at his residence in Cuttack, aged 78, following prolonged illness and multiple organ complications. He died of cardiac arrest and respiratory failure.

== Academic work ==
Sukla was the founding editor of Journal of Comparative Literature and Aesthetics, published since 1978. He collaborated with renowned international scholars of the time like Rene Wellek, Mircea Eliade, M.H. Abrams, Harold Osborne, John Fisher, M.C. Beardsley, John Hospers, and many noted Indian scholars to launch the journal in 1977. He was also the founder of the Vishvanatha Kaviraja Institute of Comparative Literature and Aesthetics which publishes the journal and original research works.

Sukla was a visiting professor to the Universities of Liverpool, Cambridge, Cardiff, Lampeter, Uppsala, Siena, Helsinki and several Indian universities.

== Publications ==
Some of his works in English include Art and Representation (2001), Art and Experience (2002) and Art and Essence (2003), published by Praeger, Art and Expression (2011) published by Verlag GmbH, Fiction and Art: Explorations in Contemporary Theory (2015) published by Bloomsbury Publishing (London), Estetica Indiana Contemporanea (Contemporary Indian Aesthetics) published by Rubbettino, Italy in 1995, Representation in Contemporary Criticism (Calcutta: Rupa & Co, 1989), Deconstruction in Contemporary Criticism (Calcutta: Rupa & Co, 1989), The Concept of Imitation in Greek and Indian Aesthetics (Calcutta, Rupa & Co, 1977), Classical Indian Tradition And The Philosophy Of Art: Essays in Comparative Aesthetics and Literary Theory (Cuttack: Brahmi Academic, 2016), and Imagination and Art: Explorations in Contemporary Theory (with Keith Moser) published by BRILL in 2020.

He has also published articles in various journals. Some of his notable essays include The Problem of Understanding and Enjoyment in Aesthetic Experience (Journal of Comparative Literature and Aesthetics: 1978), Theory of Impersonal Art (JCLA: 1978), Future of Art: Some Indian Views (International Congress on the Philosophy of Art, Finland: 1991), Mimesis in Greek and Indian Aesthetics (The Major Currents of 20th Century Aesthetics, Italy: 1991), Representation in Painting and Drama: Arguments from Indian Aesthetics (JCLA: 1992), Aesthetics Beyond/Within Aesthetics: The Scope and Limits of Aesthetics in Indian Antiquity (JCLA: 1995), Art, Nature and the Artifactuality of Art and Nature: A Plea for Environmental Aesthetics in Ancient India (JCLA: 1996), Art, Environment, and the Aesthetics of Art and Environment: A Chapter from Indian Philosophy (JCLA: 1996), Emotion, Aesthetic Experience and the Contextualist Turn (International Yearbook of Aesthetics, Sweden: 1996), Art, Reality and the Reality of the Arts: Ontology, Representation and The Sister Arts Theory in Indian Aesthetics (Indian Response to Literary Theory: Delhi: 1996), Rasa, Sringara and Sringara Rasa: Aesthetics as Mass Culture in Indian Antiquity (Dialogue and Universalism: 1997), Dhvani as a Pivot in Sanskrit Literary Aesthetics (East and West in Aesthetics, Italy, 1997), Transculturality of Classical Indian Aesthetics (Frontiers of Transculturality in Contemporary Aesthetics, Italy: 2001), among others.

He has also published fiction in Odia, including two short story books, Sulataku Sesa Chitthi (The Last Letter to Sulata) and Shatabdira Shabda (The Sound of the Millennium), two poetry books, Manapatra (Citation) and Nihshabda Asavari (The Silent Raga), and four character plays on Kabi Bansiballabha, Pallikabi Nandakishore, and patriots Jayee Rajguru and Chakhi Khuntia. His non-fiction work in Odia includes Paschatya Sahityara Itihaas (History of Western Literature).

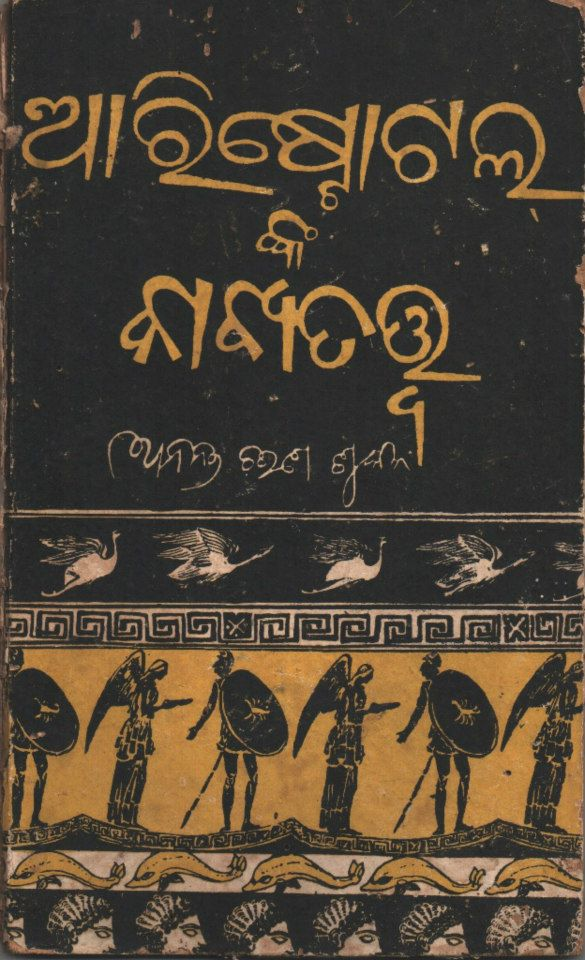
Odia Translation of Aristotle's poetics (with critical notes, commentaries and essays)

He has translated some major Western works into Odia like Aristotle'nka Kabyatattwa (Aristotle's Poetics with an introduction, commentary, critical study and notes); Greek Nataka (Greek Dramas of Aeschylus's 'Prometheus Bound', Sophocles's 'Oedipus the King', Euripides's 'Medea' and Aristophanes's 'The Frogs' with commentary and critical notes); and Jagannath Chakraborty'nka Kabita (Poems of Jagannath Chakraborty).

The Kendriya Sahitya Akademi (National Academy of Letters), Delhi has published his monographs on medieval Sanskrit poetician and grammarian Vishvanatha Kaviraja, medieval philosopher of religion Sridhara Svami and post-Chaitanya philosopher of religion Baladeva Vidyabhusana under its Makers of Indian Literature series.

He has also translated into Odia select songs of Rabindranath Tagore and Bhupen Hazarika from Bengali and Assamese respectively. His Odia versions have been recorded and released in the form of studio albums namely Tume Sandhayara Meghamala (Love Songs of Tagore), Hey Jibananatha (Devotional Songs of Tagore), and Mu Gote Jajabara (Songs of Bhupen Hazarika).
