= Nagartha =

Indian caste

- Religions: Hinduism
- Country: India
- Populated states: Karnataka
- Region: South India
- Endogamous: Yes

The Nagartha or Nagarta are Vaishya as per Hindu caste of south India of merchants or agriculturalists.

The Nagartha caste contains two main divisions, Vaishnavas or Namadhari Nagarthas and Shiv or Lingadhari Nagarthas.
