= Neyak =

Neyak (Persian: نيك) may refer to:

- Neyak, Mazandaran
- Neyak, South Khorasan
- Neyak, Tehran

== See also ==
- Nayak (disambiguation)
