= Nayakan (disambiguation) =

Nayakan (English: The Hero) is a 1987 Indian Tamil-language film starring Kamal Haasan.

Nayakan may also refer to:

- Nayakan (1985 film), an Indian Malayalam-language film starring Mohanlal
- Nayagan (2008 film), an Indian Tamil-language film starring J. K. Rithesh
- Nayakan (2010 film), an Indian Malayalam-language film starring Indrajith Sukumaran

== See also ==
- Nayak (disambiguation)
- Naik (disambiguation)
- Nayagam (disambiguation)
