= Nayagam =

Nayagam may refer to:

- S. M. Nayagam, Sri Lankan cinema pioneer
- Xavier S. Thani Nayagam (1913–1980), Tamil scholar

== See also ==
- Nayakan (disambiguation)
