= Philosophy and Literature =

American academic journal

- Discipline: Philosophy, Literature
- Language: English
- Edited by: Garry Hagberg

Publication details
- History: 1977–present
- Publisher: Johns Hopkins University Press (United States)
- Frequency: Biannually

Standard abbreviations
- ISO 4: Philos. Lit.

Indexing
- ISSN: 0190-0013 (print); 1086-329X (web)
- OCLC no.: 33895278

Links
- Journal homepage; Online access

Philosophy and Literature is an American academic journal founded in 1977 by Denis Dutton. It explores the connections between literary and philosophical studies by presenting ideas on the aesthetics of literature, critical theory, and the philosophical interpretation of literature. Although the journal was characterized as "culturally conservative" under Dutton, it has since "moved away from the kind of polemics that, in the late 1990s, found it very publicly locking horns with Judith Butler."

The journal is normally published twice a year, in April and October, by the Johns Hopkins University Press. Circulation is 823 and the average length of an issue is 224 pages. The current editor is Garry Hagberg of Bard College.
