= Namadhari =

- Religions: Hinduism
- Country: India
- Populated states: Andhra Pradesh, Karnataka, Tamil Nadu and Telangana
- Region: South India
- Endogamous: Yes

Namadhari is a term used for people of all castes who follow Sri Vaishnava tradition, sport vermillion nama (a vertical mark) on their foreheads and consider Sri Ramanujacharya as their guru. There are a number of different Namadhari castes like Namadhari Naik in Uttara Kannada, Udupi and Dakshina Kannada Districts, Namdhari Vokkaligas in Malenadu, Namadhari Nagarthas in southern Karnataka and northern Tamil Nadu. and Namadhari Dasari in Andhra Pradesh, Karnataka and Telangana.

== See also ==
- Ramanujacharya
- Sri Vaishnava
