= Satya - Swaroop =

Nepalese singers

Satya - Swaroop सत्य स्वरूप
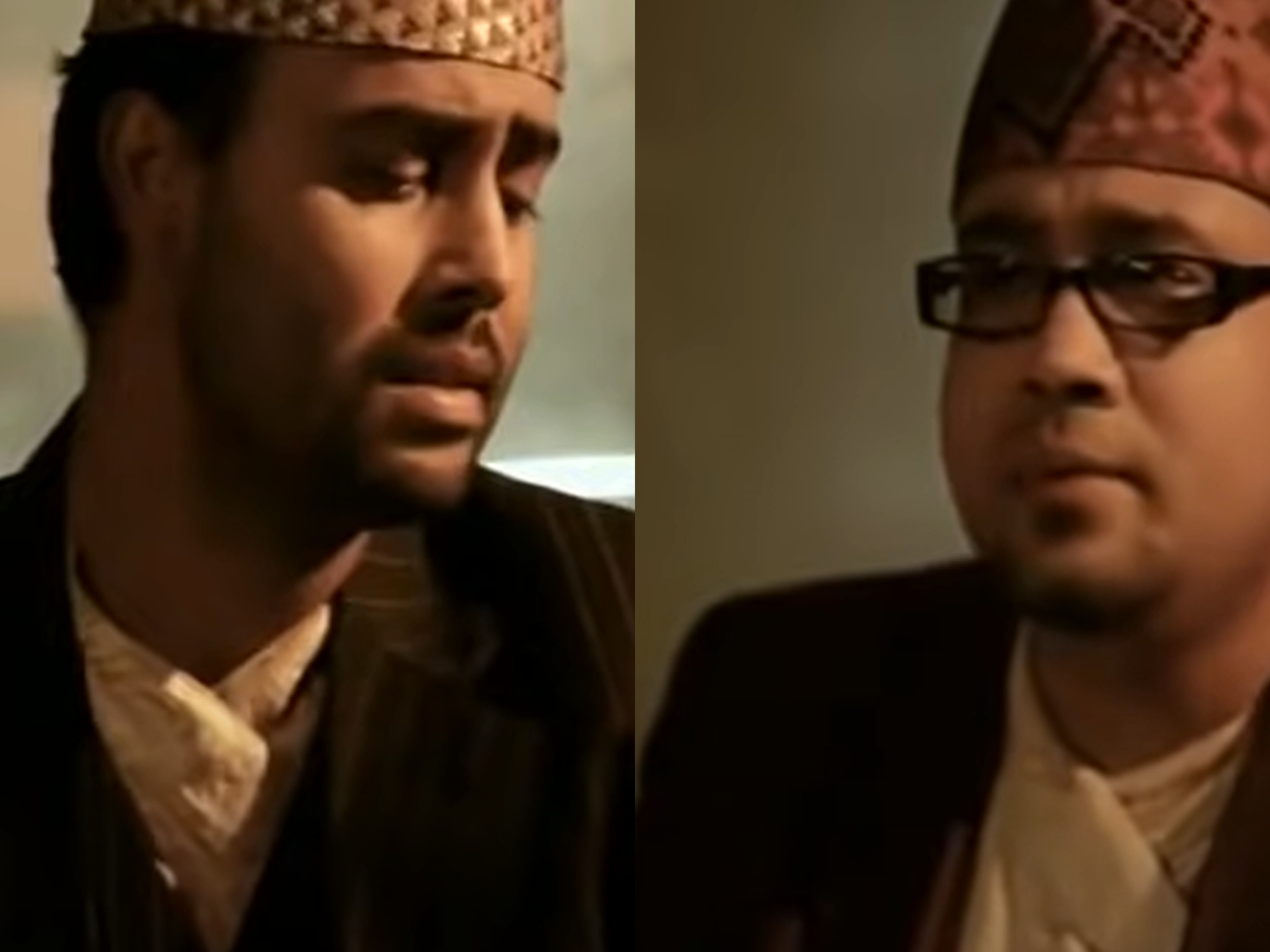
- Satya (left) and Swaroop Raj Acharya

Background information
- Origin: Kathmandu, Nepal
- Genres: Classical; semi-classical; pop; bhajan; popular
- Instruments: Vocals; harmonium; guitar
- Years active: 1992-present
- Label: Music Nepal
- Members: Satya Raj Acharya; Swaroop Raj Acharya

Satya Raj Acharya and Swaroop Raj Acharya (Nepali: सत्य राज आचार्य / स्वरूप राज आचार्य) are Nepali singers, songwriters, and composers. They are also biological brothers. Satya is the elder and Swaroop is the younger. They often perform together, for which reason they are credited together by their first names. They are the sons of renowned singer, Bhakta Raj Acharya.

Satya Raj Acharya is also an actor; he acted in the 2011 film Acharya, which was a biopic based on his father's life.

== Personal life ==
Sons of one of Nepal's most renowned singers, Satya and Swaroop were raised in a musically inclined environment because their father is a well-known figure in the nation. They have performed numerous songs, both individually and collectively. Even though they have numerous individual songs, they frequently perform in concerts together and are referred to as a team, so they are given credit as a component.

== Partial discography ==
Year	Song	Lyricist(s)	Composer(s)	Notes	Ref(s)
1994	Nashalu Aakhale Maryo	Satya - Swaroop	Satya - Swaroop		
2010	Mero Desh Dubna Lagyo	Satya - Swaroop	Satya - Swaroop		
2011	Aago Ko Raap Jeevan		Bhakta Raj Acharya		
2015	Manmohini	Uttam Bhaukajee	Swaroop Raj Acharya	Sung by Swaroop only.	
2016	Gori Bhanda Malai Ta	Satyaraj Acharya	Satyaraj Acharya	Sung by Satya only.	
2020	Soltini Soltini	Satya - Swaroop	Satya - Swaroop		
2020	Maisaab Le	Amrit Khatiwada, Satya - Swaroop	Satya - Swaroop		
2020	Naari	Champa Basnet	Satya - Swaroop	Sung by Swaroop only.	
2021	Dada Ghare Saili	Krishna KC	Shreekrishna Bam Malla	Sung by Swaroop only. His first Dohori song.	
2022	Sani Ryai Ryai Ryai	Dev Gahatraj	Dev Gahatraj	Sung by Satya only.	
