= Garry L. Hagberg =

British author, philosopher and jazz musician

Garry L. Hagberg is an author, professor, philosopher, and jazz musician. He is currently the James H. Ottaway Jr. Professor of Philosophy and Aesthetics at Bard College.

== Career ==
Hagberg has a bachelor's degree, master's degree, and Ph.D. from the University of Oregon, and was a postdoctoral scholar at the University of Cambridge. He became a professor of philosophy at Bard College in 1990, and previously held the position of Chair of the Department of Philosophy at the University of East Anglia.

Hagberg was one of three 2020 recipients of the Peter Kivy Prize of the American Society for Aesthetics. He was the 2024 Richard Wollheim Lecturer of the British Society of Aesthetics, and the 2025 Monroe Beardsley Lecturer of the American Society for Aesthetics.

== Jazz ==
Hagberg is a jazz guitar player. He has performed in Germany and the United States and has co-authored several books on guitar instruction.

== Scholarly works ==
Hagberg is the editor of the journal Philosophy and Literature.

He is the author of four academic books:

- Living in Words: Literature, Autobiographical Language, and the Composition of Selfhood (Oxford University Press, 2023),
- Describing Ourselves: Wittgenstein and Autobiographical Consciousness (Clarendon Press, 2008),
- Art as Language: Wittgenstein, Meaning, and Aesthetic Theory (Cornell University Press, 1995), and
- Meaning and Interpretation: Wittgenstein, Henry James and Literary Knowledge (Cornell University Press, 1994).

His edited volumes include:

- Art and Ethical Criticism (Blackwell, 2008),
- A Companion to the Philosophy of Literature (edited with Walter Jost, 2010), and
- Fictional Characters, Real Problems: The Search for Ethical Content in Literature (Oxford University Press, 2016).
