= Ramachandra Achar =

American engineer

- Engineering career
- Institutions: Carleton University

Ramachandra Achar from the Carleton University, Ottawa, ON, Canada was named Fellow of the Institute of Electrical and Electronics Engineers (IEEE) in 2013 for contributions to interconnect and signal integrity analysis in high-speed designs.

== Early life and education ==
Achar was born in Udupi, Karnataka, India. He earned his Bachelor of Engineering in Electronics from Bangalore University in 1990. He then proceeded with a Master of Engineering in Microelectronics at Birla Institute of Technology and Science, Pilani, in 1992. In 1998, he completed his Ph.D. in Electrical Engineering at Carleton University.
