= Viswanatha Kaviraja =

Indian poet

Viśvanātha Kavirāja
- Occupations: Poet, scholar

Viśvanātha Kavirāja, most widely known for his masterpiece in aesthetics, Sāhityadarpaṇa, was a prolific poet, scholar, and rhetorician who worked during the reigns of two successive Eastern Ganga rulers of Kalinga (modern Odisha) – King Narasimha Deva IV and King Nishanka Bhanudeva IV. In absence of availability of exact dates of his birth and date, the periods of their rules, 1378 AD – 1434 AD, is assumed to be the time of Viswanatha.

== Family history ==
Viswanatha was born to a Vaidya family of scholars and poets. His grandfather, Narayana Dasa, wrote a commentary on Gitagovinda, the most well-known Sanskrit work in the Vaishnavite tradition, written by Jayadeva, a major Sanskrit poet from Odisha, who lived in circa 1200 AD. Narayana Dasa's brother, Chandi Dasa, wrote a commentary on Kavyaprakasha, an earlier work on poetics, written by aesthetician Mammatha. Viswanatha's father, Chandrashekhara also wrote a few poems.

Both Viswanatha and his father held the titles of ministers of war and peace (Sandhivigrahika Mahapatra) in the courts of the kings of Kalinga.

Viswanatha's son, Ananta Dasa, also wrote commentaries and notes on Sahityadarpana.

== Works of Viswanatha ==
Viswanatha was not just prolific he was equally versatile. Apart from studying and researching aesthetics, he created a number of literary works, in all the branches of literature – poetry, prose, criticism, and drama. He wrote equally easily in Sanskrit and Prakrit. Viswanatha is supposed to have mastered eighteen languages. In fact, he wrote one of his works, Prasasti Ratnavali in sixteen languages.

Some of his major works include Chandrakala Natika (playlet), Prabhavati Parinaya (drama), Raghava Vilasa (long poem), Raghava Vilapa (poem), Kuvalayasva Charita (poem in Prakrit), Prasasti Ratnavali (poem in sixteen languages), Narasimha Vijaya (poem), Sahityadarpana (study in aesthetics), Kavyaprakasha darpana (criticism), Kamsavadha (poem), and Lakshmistava (verses).

== Sahityadarpana ==
Sahityadarpana ("mirror of composition" in Sanskrit) is Viswanatha's most famous work and arguably one of the most comprehensive works in Indian aesthetics. According to PV Kane, author of A History of Sanskrit Poetics, Viswanatha is believed to have written Sahityadarpana before 1384 AD.

Sahityadarpana is different from earlier works in aesthetics in two major ways. One, for the first time, it combined, in one treatise, both the sravya aspect (poetics) and drisya aspect (dramaturgy) of aesthetics. Before Viswanatha, aestheticians had confined themselves largely to one aspect, though they often referred to the other.

Also, while earlier writers on the subject, had by and large confined themselves to their own school of thought, only referring intermittently, if at all to other schools, Viswanatha, in Sahityadarpana, explicitly discussed all schools and thoughts of Indian aesthetics, before arguing the superiority of the dhvani school. There too, Viswanatha, does not agree with the equal importance given to the three types of dhvani as classified by ninth century Kashmiri aesthetician, Anandavardhana, who in his book, Dhvanyālóka, actually established the dhvani school of poetics. Viswanatha concludes that rasa dhvani is what defines poetry.

Sahityadrpana's definition of poetry – vakyam rasatmakam kavyam (any composition which gives tasteful pleasure is poetry) has been cited most frequently by modern critics while defining poetry. Rasa, a complex concept used in Sanskrit aesthetics, from first century onwards, is conceptually fairly similar to what T. S. Eliot, centuries later, called objective correlative.

Sahityadarpana has ten chapters. In the first chapter, it defines poetry. In the second chapter, it defines what a sentence or composition is. In the third – and one of the most important – it defines rasa. The other important chapters are chapter six, which deals with dramaturgy, and the ninth and tenth chapters. The former deals with ritis or styles, while the last chapter explains the theories with examples.

Sahityadarpana has often been criticised as being more a compilation than an original work. However, even its harshest critics agree that it is the most comprehensive work on the subject. Many also particularly point to the lucid style of Sahityadarpana as one of the prime reasons for its popularity in large parts of India, from the Deccan to Kashmir.

== Works on Viswanatha Kaviraja ==
Sahitya Akademi, Delhi (India) has published a book on the life and works of Vishvanatha Kaviraja, under its 'Makers of Indian Literature' series. The 172-page book has been authored by Professor Ananta Charan Sukla, an eminent writer and philosopher of art, religion and language. The book attempts at offering a comprehensive account of his treatment of poetry, presents the historical data in its theoretical perspectives, surveys the development of Sanskrit poetics from the earlier times till his entry, and discusses different topics he considered relevant for a complete examination and assessment of the subject matter he deals with such as the definition, structure and end of poetry. The book has two long chapters with an elaborate introduction to the life and works of Vishvanatha providing all historical data. While the first chapter deals with Sanskrit poetics in the making, the second one discusses Vishvanatha's theory of poetry explaining the intricate structure of his poetics.
