= Naik (social group) =

Tribal community from India

Naik is a tribal community residing primarily in the regions of Gujarat, Malwa, and Punjab. They are alternatively known by names such as Naikda, Nayak, and Nayakda. In Punjab, the community comprises both Hindu and Muslim members. The community is distinct from the Bhandari community of the Konkan region and Goa, who also use "Naik" as a surname, as there is no ancestral or genealogical link between the two groups.

== History and occupation ==
Historically, the Naik people lived in forest environments under primitive conditions, relying on activities such as raiding nearby settlements, looting, and violent conflicts to sustain themselves. This lifestyle changed after the British administration banned these activities, leading the community to adopt a settled way of life. Consequently, they transitioned to occupations such as agriculture, woodcutting, and manual labor as porters.

== Lifestyle and culture ==
=== Housing ===
The members of the community construct and inhabit huts made of bamboo. The walls of these dwellings are plastered with cow dung, while the roofs are thatched using grass or coconut leaves.

=== Social integration ===
In Gujarat, the Kharvi people were previously referred to as Naik, a group that was traditionally accorded a high social status. The Naik community has integrated other groups, including the Kharvi and the Bhil, into their own fold.

== Religious beliefs and festivals ==
The community primarily worships deities such as Kalika, Amba, and Mahakali, holding a particularly deep reverence for the goddess situated at Pavagadh. In certain localities, they engage in the worship of spirits and ghosts, as well as the Shami tree. The tiger is considered a sacred animal; members of the community frequently swear oaths by the tiger to demonstrate their truthfulness.

The major festivals celebrated by the community include Holi Punav, Akshaya Tritiya, Diwali, and Divaso.

== Social customs ==
=== Marriage ===
Marriages are typically arranged by parents once the children reach adulthood. Marriages between cross-cousins or parallel cousins are prohibited. During the marriage alliance, the groom's father provides a bride-price consisting of money, grain, or utensils to the bride's father.

If a woman reaches the age of sixteen without an arranged marriage, she is permitted to cohabit with a partner of her choice without a formal wedding. The male partner can subsequently obtain social approval for the union by paying a monetary sum to her parents. If an unmarried woman enters into a relationship with a man from the community, he is required to marry her. Should he refuse, the community council convenes, seats him on the woman's lap, and obliges him to address her as "Mother" seven times.

The wedding rituals begin with the bride and groom being carried on the shoulders of individuals who dance inside the marriage pavilion. Following this, the couple is seated facing one another, and their garments are tied together in a knot. A cloth is placed over their heads, during which they feed each other sweet items. The removal of this head cloth marks the completion of the wedding ceremony. In some areas, the custom involves walking around the sacred fire four times.

=== Death rituals ===
The community practices cremation for the deceased. On the tenth day following a death, the collected bones and ashes are arranged in a mound, upon which a water-filled earthen pot is placed, before being immersed in a river. Upon returning home from the immersion, men shave their facial hair, bathe, and perform the ritual of Pindadaan. The family observes a ten-day period of mourning, which concludes with a community feast on the twelfth day.

While traditional Shradh ceremonies are not practiced, the community commemorates the deceased by fashioning a crude idol, erecting it in the courtyard, and offering worship to it.

== Governance ==
Internal community matters and disputes are adjudicated by a traditional caste panchayat (council). The council resolves all conflicts and penalizes individuals who violate community regulations by imposing monetary fines. The funds collected through these fines are utilized in procedures meant to ritually purify the offender.
