= S. K. Ramachandra Rao =

Indian scholar (1925–2006)

Vidyalankara, Sastrachudamani, Vedantanidhi, Sangitakalaratan S. K. Ramachandra Rao
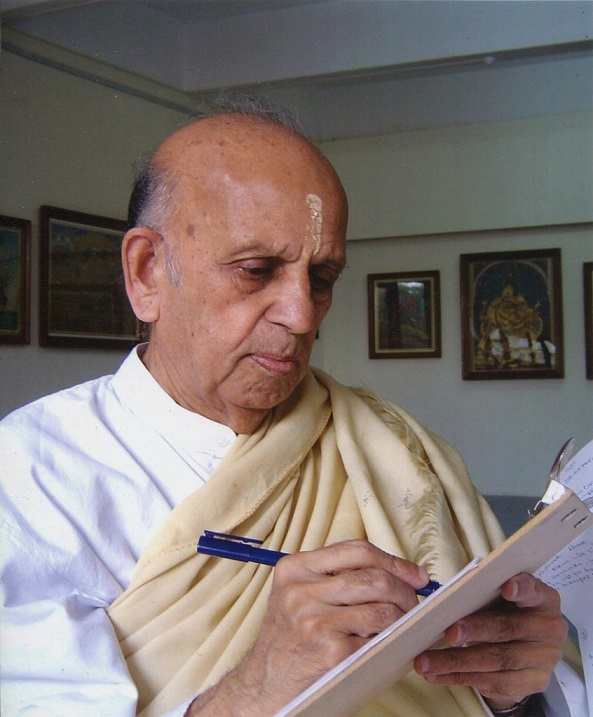
- S. K. Ramachandra Rao
- Born: Saligrama Krishna Ramachandra Rao; 4 September 1925; Hassan, Karnataka, Kingdom of Mysore, British India (now Karnataka state)
- Died: 2 February 2006 (aged 80); Bangalore, India
- Education: University of Mysore
- Occupations: Author; psychologist; sanskrit scholar

Vidyalankara Saligrama Krishna Ramachandra Rao (4 September 1925 – 2 February 2006) was an Indian author, Sanskrit scholar and professor of psychology.

His books, most of them in Kannada and English, deal with Indian culture, philosophy, art, music, and literature. They are based on research he conducted on ancient Indian texts and rare manuscripts. He was working on a thirty-two volume project on the Rigveda in English at the time of his death.

== Early life ==
Saligrama Krishna Ramachandra Rao was born in a Kannada Madhva Brahmin family on September 4, 1925, in Hassan, a small town in South India. He spent his early childhood with his grandparents in Bangalore, where he started school. He also started learning Sanskrit from Agnihotri Yajnavitthalachar, a scholar. This training in Sanskrit would help him write numerous books later in life.

When his grandfather died, he moved to Nanjanagudu, a small town, where his parents were staying at the time. He soon moved to Mysore to finish school. In 1949 he graduated with a master's degree in psychology from University of Mysore.

== Work ==
He first worked as a research assistant at the Indian Institute of Science and rose to become head of its department of Psychology. From 1954 to 1965, he was Professor of Psychology at the All India Institute of Mental Health (now NIMHANS).

In 1962, while at NIMHANS, he wrote a book The Development of Psychological Thought in India. He also created an Indian version of the Thematic Apperception Test (TAT) cards and conducted experiments based on them. He was also instrumental in revising the syllabus that was taught at NIMHANS to include aspects of Indian philosophy that had influenced the study of psychology.

He left NIMHANS in 1965, and worked as a visiting professor in various institutions in Bangalore, lecturing and teaching courses in psychology, indology, philosophy, social work and education.

In later life, he divided his time between public speaking, writing and teaching students at home.

== Author ==
His books deal primarily with Indian culture, philosophy, art, music, and literature. They are based on research he conducted on ancient Indian texts and rare manuscripts.

He has also written a play in Sanskrit, a commentary in Pali on Visuddhimagga, a book by Buddhaghosa. He has also written a treatise in Pali called Sumangala-gatha which was published in the journal The Light of the Dhamma.

At the time of his death, he was working on a thirty-two volume project on the Rigveda in English. Volume sixteen was published two years after his death in 2007.

== Other work ==
He was also a painter and a sculptor. One of his works is on permanent display at Ravindra Kalakshetra in Bangalore.

== Death ==
He died on February 2, 2006, in Bangalore. He is survived by his wife and two children.
