= Bhakta Raj Acharya =

Nepali singer and music-composer (1942–2024)

- भक्तराज आचार्य
- Born: 2 October 1942; Kurule Tenupa Dhankuta, Nepal
- Died: 26 February 2024 (aged 81); Lalitpur, Nepal
- Other name: Bhajan Shiromani
- Occupations: Singer, composer
- Years active: 1973–1986
- Spouse: Sushila Acharya
- Children: Satya Raj Acharya; Swaroop Raj Acharya
- Parent(s): Balabhadra Acharya; Renu Acharya
- Awards: Swami Narayanacharya Shruti Samman (2010); Padma Shree Sadhana Samman (2020)

Bhakta Raj Acharya (Nepali: भक्तराज आचार्य; 2 October 1942 – 26 February 2024), commonly referred to as Bhajan Shiromani, was a Nepali singer and music-composer, widely known as one of the greatest singers of all time in Nepal. He was born in Dhankuta, Nepal and raised in Kalimpong, India. He moved to Nepal in the 1970s during the flight of Darjeeling singers to Nepal. Acharya's career started in 1973 after he won a gold medal in an All Nepal Song Competition held by Radio Nepal. His career spanned until 1986. He recorded 450 songs and composed about 25–30 songs.

His sons, Satya Raj Acharya and Sworoop Raj Acharya also known jointly as Satya-Swaroop, have followed in their father's footsteps and have established themselves as promising singers.

Acharya died due to health complications on 26 February 2024 in Nepal Mediciti Hospital.

== Popular songs by Bhakta Raj Acharya ==
=== Songs ===
- Mutu Jali Rahechha
- Jati Chot Dinchhau
- Jahan Chhan Buddha Ka Aankha
- Hajar Sapana Haru Ko
- Maya Meri Sanjha Bani
- Hajar Aankha Herne
- Kohi Nagaros Prem Amar
- Ek Din Maile Prabhu Sanga Sodhe
- Priya Timro Muhara Ma
- Mero Sadhana Ko
- Sabai Behosi Nasha Piyera
- Yaha Jindagile

=== Bhajan ===
- Tan Man Bachanle
- Ram Yahi Chhan
- Rahenachha Mero Kohi Bhagawan
- Jai Guru Ganapati
- Ek Din Maile
- Bhagawan Jeevan Nau
- Bajirahechha Basuri
- Durge Deu Bhakti Malai
- Chadani Raat Ma
- Kesh Le Nai Gheriyeki

== Popular culture ==
In 2011, a renowned filmmaker from Sikkim, Prashant Rasaily directed the movie "Acharya", which was a biopic based on the life of Bhaktaraj Acharya. It received a good response by the movie critics. Acharya's elder son, Satya Raj Acharya, played his character in the movie.
