= Sanjit Acharya =

Bangladeshi singer (1953–2024)

- Born: 1953; Chafra, Chittagong District, East Bengal, Pakistan
- Died: 9 December 2024 (aged 71); Chattogram, Bangladesh
- Occupations: Singer-songwriter, playwright
- Known for: Chattogram Folk-music, Maizbhandari
- Notable work: Ore Sampanwala

Sanjit Acharya (1953 – 9 December 2024) was a Bangladeshi singer, composer, playwright and lyricist from Chattogram. He is best known for his song O Re Sampanwala, which was used in his play Sampanwala.

== Life and career ==
Sanjit Acharya was a Bangladeshi singer, composer, playwright, and lyricist from Chattogram. He is best known for his song O Re Sampanwala, which was used in his play Sampanwala. His other notable creations include Amar Moner Bedona Bondhu Chara Jane Na and Banshkhali Moishkhali Pal Uraiya Dile Sampan Gur Gurai Chole. He wrote two plays: Sampanwala and Sonai Bandhu. Both were later turned into films. His music first gained national attention in 1978, when two of his duets with Kalyani Ghosh—"Gura Gura Kotha Hoi Baganer Adale" and "Satya Gori Hao Na Cox's Bazar Loi Jaiba"—were recorded on gramophone. He has written or composed over 1,000 songs.

=== Notable songs ===
- Satya Gori Hao Na Cox's Bazar Loi Jaiba
- Gura Gura Kotha Hoi Baganer Adale
- Ore Bus Conductor
- Ore Sampanwala
- Ore Karnaphulire Shakkhi Rakhilam Tore...
