= Nyack =

Nyack may refer to:

- Nyack, New York, a village
- Nyack College, whose main campus is in the village
- Nyack Tract, a former Lenape settlement in Brooklyn
- Nyack Mountain, a summit in Montana, US
- Nyack Pippin, or Nyack, a form of pippin apple
- USS Nyack, the name of two U.S. Navy vessels
- Nyack, Montana, a location in Flathead County, Montana
