= K. Janardanan =

Indian artist from Kerala

K. Janardanan, better known as Artist Janardanan, is a painter in the state of Kerala, India. His paintings depict the culture and tradition of Kannur, which has a resonant past with myths and legends. He has a passion for Theyyam, which is the vibrant ritual dance of North Kerala. His most acclaimed works symbolize the rich cultural heritage and folklore of his land.

Though Theyyam had been used a motif in his paintings in the 1980s, he has made a significant move as his recent works show a different context. He is emphasizing more on figurations. His paintings are also sensitive to the social environment and they empathize with human beings in distress. Though he was adept in perpetually changing trends of art, he maintains a very exceptional and captivating style of his own. His paintings have their own language and no wonder they won him rave reviews.

== Early life ==
Janardanan was born in Kannur, a district in North Kerala, India in 1935. He started off his art education at a very young age. He worked as head of the department of art and photography at Calicut University.

== Awards ==
- Kerala Lalitha Kala Akademi- 1970,1973,1974 and 1978
- Highly Commended certificate – 1987 and 1995

== Honours ==
- 2001 - Kaladarpanam - Cochin
- 2011 - Kerala Chitrakala Partishath
- 2012 - Kerala Laithkala Akademi
