= Nayak =

Nayak may refer to:

== Ethnic groups ==
- Nayak caste, a caste found in India
- Nayak, another name for the Charodi of Karnataka, India
- Nayak, name used by Gor Banjara community

== Films ==
- Nayak (1966 film), a 1966 Indian Bengali film directed by Satyajit Ray
- Nayak (2001 Assamese film), a 2001 Indian Assamese film directed by Munin Barua
- Nayak: The Real Hero, a 2001 Indian Hindi film starring Anil Kapoor and Rani Mukerji
- Yaare Koogadali, a 2012 Indian Kannada film titled Nayak: The Hero 2 in Hindi
- Preethsod Thappa, a 1998 Indian Kannada film titled Nayak: The Hero 3 in Hindi

== People ==
- Nayak (surname), list of people with the name

== Other uses ==
- Naik (military rank), also spelt Nayak, a rank in the Indian and Pakistan armies
- Nayak (title), a title used across India
- Any of the Nayak dynasties, a group of Hindu dynasties that arose from the fragmentation of the Vijayanagara Empire in South India
- Baba Nayak, fictional villain played by Rami Reddy in the 1995 Indian film Andolan

== See also ==
- Nayakan (disambiguation)
- Naik (disambiguation)
- Naicker (disambiguation)
- Neyak (disambiguation)
- Nyack (disambiguation)
- Hero (disambiguation)
- Naayak, a 2013 Indian Telugu-language film directed by V. V. Vinayak
- Khal Nayak (lit. 'Antihero'), a 1993 Indian film by Subhash Ghai
