= Eliane Rosa Naika =

Malagasy politician

Eliane Rosa Naika (born March 31, 1955, in Majunga) is a Malagasy politician. She is a member of the Senate of Madagascar for Menabe, and is a member of the Tiako I Madagasikara party.
