= Charodi (community) =

Community found in Karnataka, India

Charodi Mesta are a community from Karnataka state in India. They are known as Konkan Achar/Acharya or Charodi in North Canara & Malenadu Karnataka, Also known as Chari in Goa, and Nayak/Mesta/Mestha in North/South Canara, Karnataka. Their traditional work is carpentry. (They are also known as Vishwa Brahmin, Shaivagayatri Brahmins/Shiva Brahman).

As per their tales, they migrated from Goa via a sea route to coastal Karnataka during Portuguese rule.

== History and religion ==
During the British Raj they were included among the "Denotified Tribes" of India.

They are followers of Sringeri Matha. Mestas are followers of Shiva, which is locally known as Ravalnath and Sringeri Matha – Sringeri Sharadamma. Ravalnath is a Kuladevata (tutelary deity) of all the Mestas, and Kuladevata still resides in Goa. While they migrated from Goa, they left their god (Kuldevata) back in Goa. Mesta samaj has its temples in Goa, Mangalore, Kundapur, Shiroor, Honnavar, Sirsi, Karwar, Sagar, and Shimoga. Many of the Mestas still reside in Goa.
