= Acharia =

Acharia may refer to:

- Acharia, Georgia
- Acharia (moth), a genus of moths in the family Limacodidae
- Acharia (plant), a genus of flowering plants in the family Achariaceae
- Basudeb Acharia (born 1942), Indian politician

== See also ==
- Acharya (disambiguation)
