= Netrani Island =

Indian island in the Arabian Sea

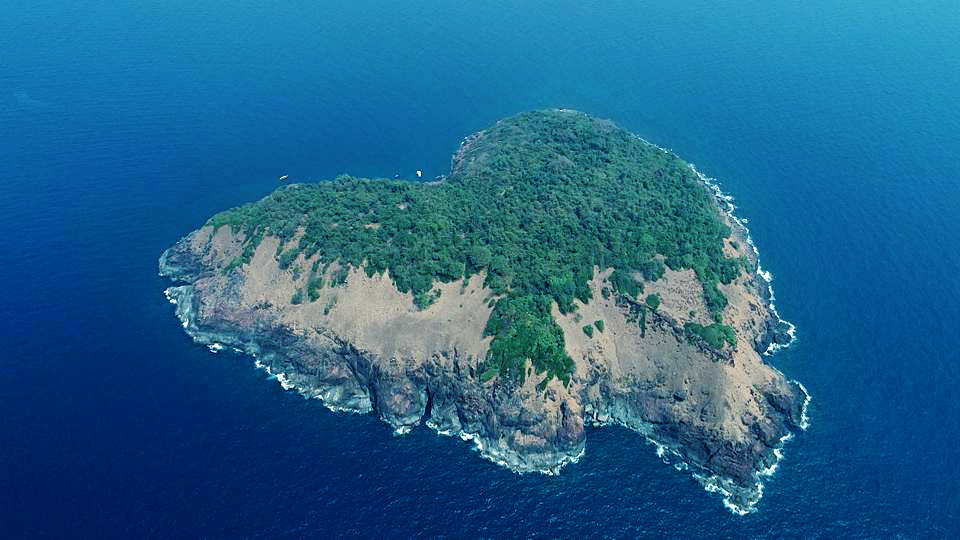
- Netrani Island

- Location within Karnataka

Geography
- Coordinates: 14.0165°N 74.3259°E
- Total islands: one

Administration
- India
- State: Karnataka
- District: Uttara Kannada
- Taluk: Bhatkal

Demographics
- Population: uninhabitated

Additional information
- Official website: http://www.netraniisland.com

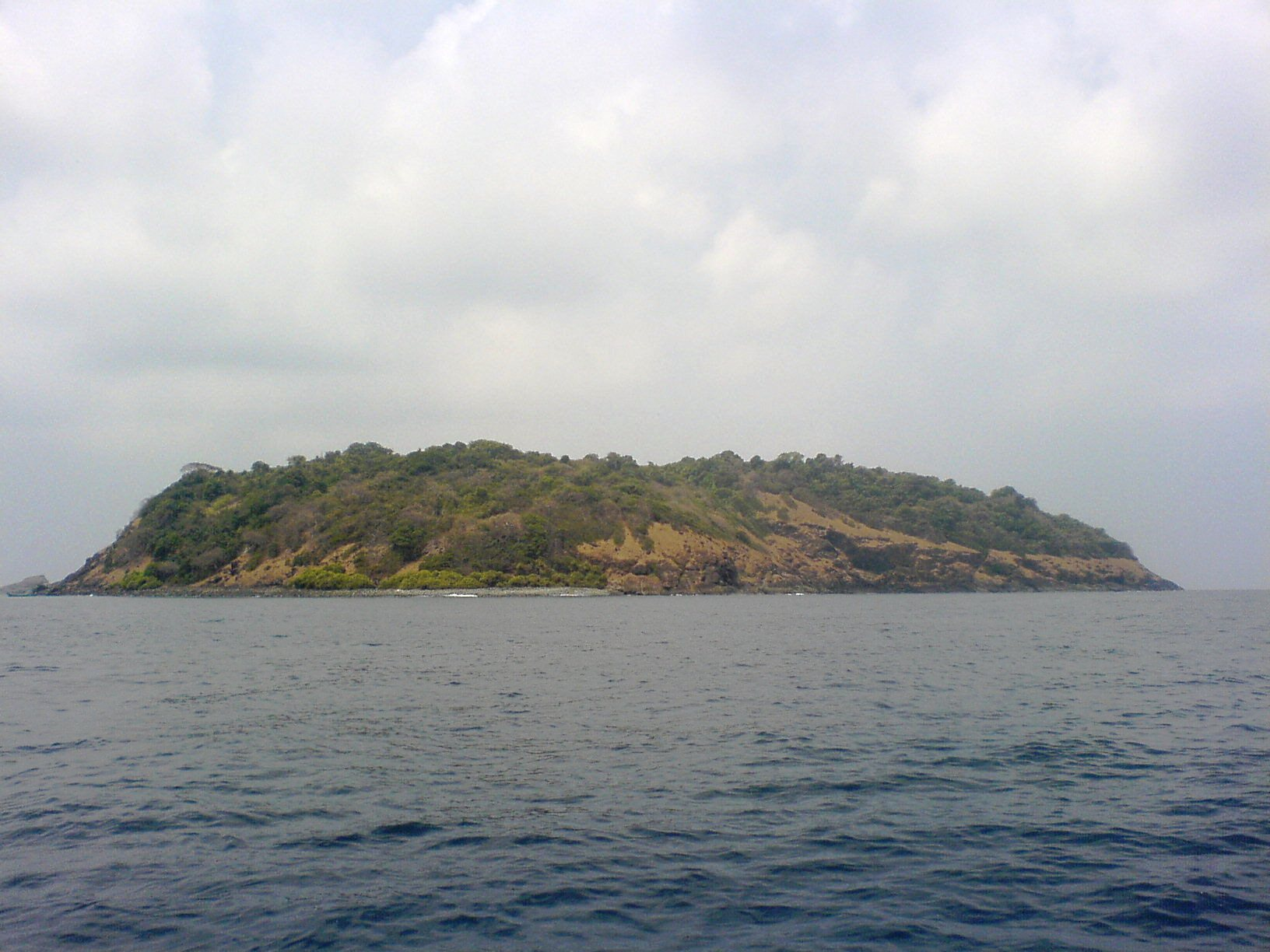
Netrani Island seen from the sea

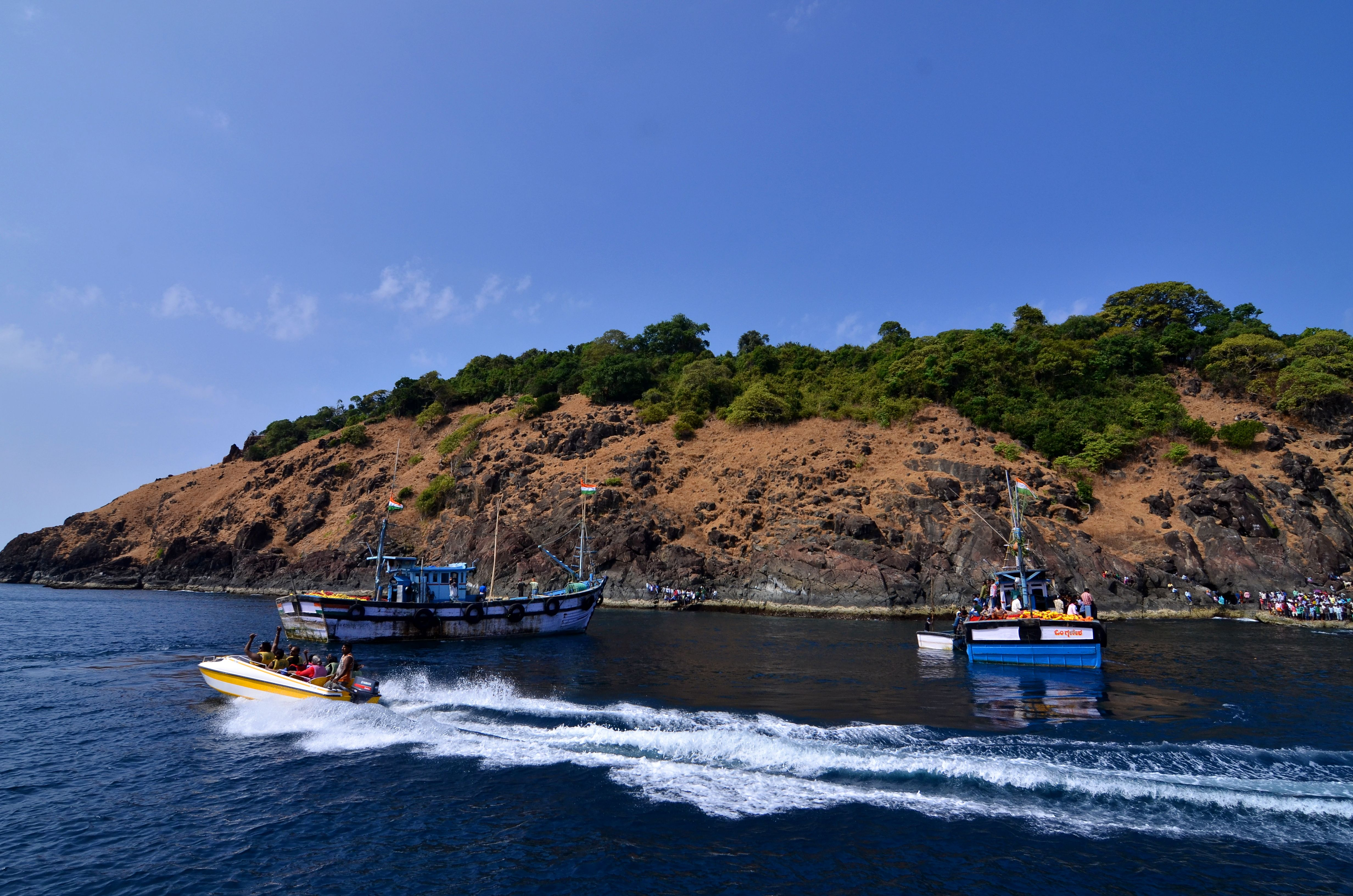
Island seen from sea

Netrani (historically known as Bajrangi Island, Pigeon Island and also Heart Shaped Island) is a small island of India located in the Arabian Sea. It is the only heart island which is present in India. It is off the coast of Karnataka situated approximately 10 nautical miles (19 km) from the temple town of Murudeshwara in Bhatkal Taluka. The island can be seen from the mainland over 15 km (9.3 mi) away. Views above give this island the appearance of being heart-shaped. Its animal inhabitants include wild goats and many pigeons. It has scuba diving and a variety of water sports facilities available to have fun and is easily accessible from Bhatkal, Mangalore, Goa, Mumbai or Bangalore. It lends itself to picnicking. There are dive shops at Murdeshwar and Goa which regularly organize trips to the island. It is known locally as Nitra Gudo. A famous Hindu temple Bajrangbali Devasthana is here. It is renowned for the ancient ritual of offering mangoes and wall clocks to Lord Hanuman, symbolizing strength and blessings. This tradition, linked to the Valmiki Ramayana and various folklores attracts thousands of devotees every year.

== Coral reef ==
Netrani is a coral island whose reefs teem with many varieties of butterfly fish, trigger fish, parrot fish, eel and shrimp. Divers have also reported seeing orcas and whale sharks around the island. Fish eagles thrive on sea snakes and fish. A species of mongoose was also spotted here, confirming mammalian inhabitants apart from bats. Whale sharks were also spotted by snorkelers. Eighty nine varieties of coral fish were found in one study.

A 16-metre (52 ft) rock used for target practice by the Indian Navy raised concerns for causing harm to the island's ecosystem. In 2012, the Karnataka High Court issued a stay on target practice.

=== Scuba Diving ===
Netrani Island has several dive sites with visibility ranging from 15 to 20 meters (49 to 66 feet). Diving is popular between June and September and is done from a boat anchored close to the island; steep cliffs and sharp rocks discourage climbing to the island proper. There are healthy coral reef with a huge variety of reef fish around the island. After initial resistance from the local fishermen, diving is now actively promoted by the Karnataka Tourism.

== Jai Bajrangbali Temple ==
An ancient Hanuman temple, visited by thousands of devotees each year, is believed to be the site where Lord Hanuman created a clay figurine of Lord Rama. According to the Vibhishan Purana (42.9.7), it is said that while flying to rescue Lakshmana, Lord Hanuman paused at this location, crafted a figurine of Lord Rama, worshipped it, and then continued on his journey."

== Devasthana Mango Rituals ==
The Jai Bajrangbali Temple on Netrani Island, Karnataka, is known for its annual ritual of offering mangoes to Lord Hanuman during a specific festival. This tradition is linked to a tale from the Valmiki Ramayana (Kishkindha Kanda, Sarga 67), where the young Hanuman mistook the Sun for a ripe mango and leapt toward it, causing cosmic disturbances. To restore balance, Indra struck him with the Vajra (thunderbolt), teaching him humility.

During the festival, devotees offer mangoes symbolizing the Sun, as a tribute to Hanuman's vitality and cosmic strength. This ritual is believed to invoke blessings of courage, energy, and wisdom. The tranquil setting of Netrani Island enhances the temple's spiritual appeal, drawing worshippers to honor Hanuman's boundless energy and devotion.

== Flag Offering Ritual ==
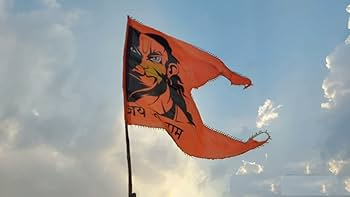
Saffron flag offered to Lord Hanuman at Bajrangbali Devasthana, Netrani Island.

At the Jai Bajrangbali Temple on Netrani Island, devotees observe the Flag Offering Ritual dedicated to Lord Hanuman. Worshippers tie or raise saffron flags bearing Hanuman’s symbol within the temple premises to seek his blessings for strength, protection, and relief from misfortune. The act symbolizes surrender and faith, as Hanuman is believed to realign destiny and remove obstacles. Once their wishes are fulfilled, devotees return to replace the old flag with a new one as a gesture of gratitude and spiritual completion. Failure to do so is regarded as an incomplete vow.

== In popular culture ==
The 2022 Kannada docudrama film Gandhada Gudi featuring Puneeth Rajkumar and Amoghavarsha consists of a scuba diving portion exploring the underwater sea life and coral reefs of Nethrani Islands.

In 2023, TV9 Bharatvarsha, an Indian news channel shot a documentary on the island for their documentary show 'Drishyam' where they claimed the island to be linked with Lord Hanuman, within years the video has surpassed millions of views on social media.

== See also ==
- Coral reefs in India
- Murudeshwara
- Gunavante
- Idagunji
