= Ganesha Temple, Idagunji =

Tourist destination near Murudeshwara, Karnataka

Shri Idagunji Maha Ganapati Temple
- ಶ್ರೀ ಮಹಾಗಣಪತಿ ದೇವರ ದೇವಸ್ಥಾನ - (ಇಡಗುಂಜಿ)
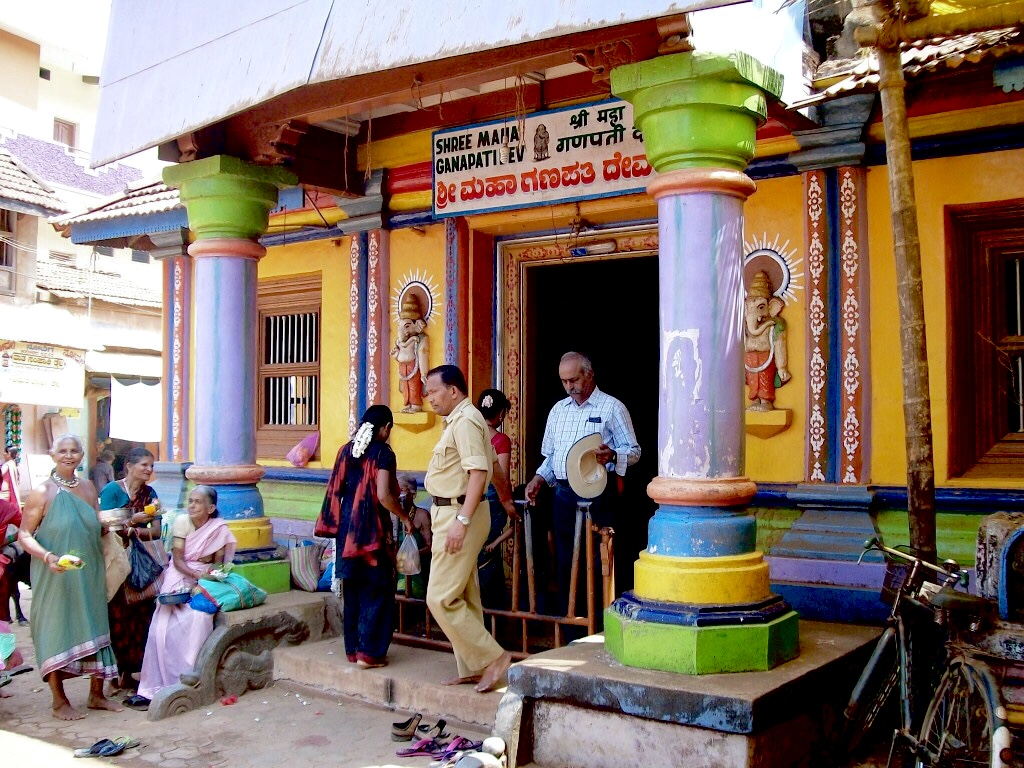

- Location in Karnataka

Religion
- Affiliation: Hinduism
- District: Uttara Kannada
- Deity: Ganesha
- Festivals: Ganesh Chaturthi, Sankashti Chaturthi, Angarika Chaturthi, Ratha Saptami

Location
- Location: Honnavara
- State: Karnataka
- Country: India
- Interactive map of Shri Idagunji Maha Ganapati Temple
- Coordinates: 14°13′48.9″N 74°29′39.89″E

Architecture
- Type: Dravidian architecture
- Completed: 4th-5th century CE

Website
- http://www.idagunjidevaru.com/

The Shri Idagunji Maha Ganapati Temple (ಇಡಗುಂಜಿ ಗಣಪತಿ) is a Hindu temple dedicated to the god Ganesha. It is one of the religious destinations near Murudeshwara, it is located on the West Coast of India in the Idagunji town in Uttara Kannada district in Karnataka. The temple's popularity as a religious place is recorded by about 1 million devotees visiting it annually.

It is one of the six Ganesha temples on the west coast of India, which is also called the "Ganesha Coast".

== Geography ==
Idagunji where the temple is located is a small village on the west coast of India close to the Sharvathi River which joins the Arabian Sea. It is close to Manki (Mavinakatte) and is about 14 km from Honnavara, 65 km from Gokarna, and 5 km from a road which branches from the National Highway 17 (India), towards the west coast. Honnavara, the capital of the taluk in which Idagunji lies, and the nearest railway station is Manki railway station.

== Legend ==
During the last phase of Dwapara, a sage by the name Valakhilya was performing penance on the banks of the river Sharavathi. The going proved tough due to many obstacles for the learned sage. The omniscient sage Narada happened to pass by that way once and the sage Valakhilya narrated his difficulties to him. Narada suggested that all hurdles could be overcome by the worship of Vighneshwara. Sage Valakhilya was convinced and he requested Narada to help him in securing the presence of Ganapathi on the bank of Sharavathi from his abode in Kailasha. Sage Narada too in his wisdom thought that in view of the fast approaching Yuga of Kali, the holi precence of such a deity was a must on the banks of river Sharavathi. He made a pilgrimage to Kailasha and placed his request before the supreme power, Shiva and his consort Parvati. In their magnanimity they graced this part of the world by sending their son Ganapathi to the Sharavathi valley to bless the greet sage Valakhilya. The light of the Kailasha thus came to this valley and bless the land with his divine presence and to remain here forever in course of time the symbolic icon was carved by Vishwakarama the divine sculptor and consecrated at Idagunji. The image of Ganapathi has its own specialty in that instead of one it has two tusks, and instead of four hands only two hands. The sacred has a granite bell and does not have the serpent like around the big belly with a necklace around the neck and the delicate hairlike stand scarved in stone at the back of the head. It is really an imposing lovely statue. Its age is assessed to be more than two thousand years. The devotees go into meditative state in a most natural way by concentrating on the image. It has the fame of showering grace on the devotees who aspire for such a grace. The Pilgrim centre is a live one. The importance of the temple is attributed to a legend, occurring at the end of the Dvapara Yuga (the third Hindu epoch or era) before the onset of Kali Yuga (the present epoch or era). Everyone feared the advent of Kali Yuga, as the god Krishna was about to leave earth for his divine abode at the end of Dvapara Yuga. Sages started performing austerities and prayers seeking Krishna's help to overcome all impediments of Kali Yuga. Sages led by Valakhilya started rituals in Kunjavana, a forest area on the banks of the Sharavati River in Karnataka which joins the Arabian Sea. During this period, he encountered many obstacles in performing the sacrifice and was very disturbed. He, therefore, sought the advice of the divine sage Narada, seeking suitable ways to tackle the problem. Narada advised Valakhilya to seek the blessings of Ganesha – the remover of obstacles – before restarting his sacrifice.

At the request of the sages, Narada selected a site for the rite on the banks of the River Sharavathi, at Kunjavana, seeking Ganesha's intervention. Even the Hindu Trinity (the gods Brahma, Vishnu, and Shiva) had visited this place in the past to bring an end to the demons who were involved in destroying the earth. The gods had even created the sacred lakes Chakratirtha and Brahmatirtha at that time. Narada and the other sages created a new sacred pond called Devatirtha. Narada invited the gods and requested Ganesha's mother Parvati to send Ganesha. The rites were performed and hymns recited extolled Ganesha. Pleased by their devotion, Ganesha consented to remain at the site to help them conduct the rituals without any trouble. On this occasion, one more lake was also created and named as Ganesha-tirtha to fetch water to the temple. The same location is now called the Idagunji, where the Ganesh Temple was built by the devotees around 4th-5th century CE.

== Central icon ==
The central icon of the Idagunji Temple dates to 4-5th century CE. The image of Ganesha in dvibhuja style, similar to that of the Gokarna Ganesha temple, nearby Idagunji. The idol at Gokarna has two arms and is standing on a stone slab. His right hand holds a lotus bud, and he holds a Modaka sweet in the other hand. He wears a garland across the chest in the style of a yagnopavita (sacred thread). Ganesha is adorned with a necklace of small bells. This idol is similar to that idol at Gokarna with similar features. This is the only dvidanta (2 teeth) Ganapati A rat, the vahana or vehicle of Ganesha, always depicted alongside Ganesha, is not depicted in this image. The image is 83 centimetres (33 in) tall and 59 centimetres (23 in) in width and is placed on stone pedestal.

== Worship ==
The Idagunji Temple is one of the prominent temples in South India, independently dedicated to Ganesha.

The Ganesha of Idagunji is the chief patron deity (Kuladevata) of the Havyaka Brahmins, who are Smarta by sect. Bandhis, a Dalit community of Karnataka, seek blessings of the deity, after conclusion of amicable marriage negotiations, for conduct of the marriage. The families of the bride and the groom visit the temple and perform the ritual of prasada keluvudu. A chit is placed on each of the legs of Ganesha and worship is performed. The falling of the chit of the right leg first is taken as a sign of divine approval to the marriage, however if the left chit falls first, an adverse verdict is inferred.

Idagunji is part of a temple circuit of six Ganesha temples along India's western coast. The circuit starts with Kasargod, Mangalore, Anegudde, Kundapura, Idagunji, and Gokarna. Any person visiting with his family all the six temples, within one day between sunrise and sunset will receive special blessings.

The best puja offering that a devotee offers to Ganesha is garike grass(doorve) which is sold in the kiosks of the temple. Many other poojas can also be performed by the devotees.

== Cultural Heritage and Souvenirs ==
Masks made out of Laavancha (vetiver) are the souvenirs to carry as gifts from the temple. Laavancha or vetiver in the raw state gives out a pleasant scent if soaked in water and it has medicinal qualities.

Sri Idagunji Mahaganapati Yakshagana Mandali, Keremane (R) is a Yakshagana repertory and art organisation named after Lord Ganesha of Idagunji. Located in the picturesque village of Gunavante, it is first and only UNESCO accredited Yakshagana NGO (under the 2003 Convention for the Safeguarding of the Intangible Cultural Heritage).

== See also ==
- List of Ganesha temples
- Gunavante
- Sri Idagunji Mahaganpati Yakshagana Mandali
