= List of Havyakas =

The following is a list of notable Havyaka Brahmin people:

- Raghaveshwara Bharati
- Chittani Ramachandra Hegde
- Keremane Shivarama Hegde
- Ramakrishna Hegde
- Gangadharendra Saraswati
- Tejasvi Surya
- Vidyamadhava

== Religious leaders ==
- Raghaveshwara Bharathi- Ramachandrapura Mutt Pontiff and Guru of Havyakas.
- Gangadharendra Saraswati - Sonda Swarnavalli Mutt Pontiff and Guru of Havyakas.
