= Urkeri =

Coordinates: 13°24′N 77°05′E

Urkeri is a small village located in the district of Uttar Kannada in the state of Karnataka in India. It has a population of about 963 persons living in around 214 households. Urkeri is a temple Village. The main deity is Lord Ganesh. Lord Ganesha is revered as the village God in these villages, in the north Kanara district. The chariot ceremony of Ganapati is celebrated on Maghi Pournima. The temple is the main attraction at Urkeri, receiving many devotees per year. Urkeri Shree Swayambhoo Devasthana is an ancient temple.

== Etymology ==
Urkeri means group of small villages. The Lord Ganesh is emerged from the earth. Abbi Ganesh temple also located and small water fall's we can see here.

== Mythology ==
Mythological reference to Urkeri describes how King Mandhata succeeded in the construction of Krishna temple after performing Ganesh (SHREE SWAYAMBHOO VINAYAKA) Pooja as per Shree Bharadwaaj Guruji’s advice.

THE STORY OF SHREE SWAYAMBHOO VINAYAKA DEVARU, URKERI is as follows: There was starvation in a part of North India where King mandhata was ruling. So he migrated from North India to the place Kundgoni which is very near to Urkeri. He wanted to construct Krishna Idol. But he did not get it the way he wanted. He approached Guru ji Bharadwaj and explained his problems to him. Guru ji Bhradwaj asked him to perform Shri Ganesh pooja and start his work so that he would not face any obstacles. On that night Lord ganesha came into King Mandhata's dream and informed where he will be. Next day King mandhata went there and found Cow dung (Gomaya).He prayed to Lord Ganesha and worshipped Gomaya only assuming Lord ganesha is in that place. Note that Gomaya is very very pure. After he worships King was able to get the Krishna Idol the way he wanted and that Krishna is Our Dear Lord Ghore Gopal Krishna. Our Dear Lord Ganesha came from earth in that place. As it has come from the earth it is called as Sri Swayambhu Vinayak Deva. May Sri Swayambhu Vinayak Deva blesses all. Every day many devotees come to temple and get his blessings. People do Bhajanaa every day in the evening. This God Vinayaka is the dearest God to everyone.

== History ==
The earliest history of the village is not known.

== Culture ==
Urkeri is full of coconut and Arekanut trees. Rice is normally grown as annual plant over here. All the people will gather during Ganesha Chaturthi in the temple and offer pooja to the God. Farmers of this village will play suggi (a type group dance) once in a year.

=== Religious attractions ===
Urkeri is an important place where most of the people learn Sanskrit.

• Swaymbhu Vinayaka Temple (Swaymbhu:Inborn) is a famous Vinayak Temple and it is inborn.

• Ganesh Chaturthi festival is celebrated here with great enthusiasm. All the people of the village gather in the temple during this time and celebrate the festival. It is believed that in this village no one should bring Ganesh Idol during this time. All should offer Pooja in the temple only.

=== Community festivals ===
• Ganesh Chaturthi

• MahaShivaratri

• Deepavali

• Makar Sankramana

== Location ==
Urkeri is about 450 km from Bangalore, 240 km north of Mangalore and about 65 km from Karwar. It is near the college towns Suratkal and Manipal. Urkeri can be reached by buses and Autos from Kumta (5 km), on National Highway 17(NH-17). Karnataka State Road Transport Corporation KSRTC also runs buses from many Kumta to Urkeri. It near Gokarna. Private buses (Vijayanand Roadlines - VRL, Sugama, Sea Bird, etc.) operate night journeys from the capital city of Bangalore to Kumta daily. It can be reached by train Konkan railway on the Mumbai to Mangalore route. The railway station is 5 km away from the village.

Neighboring villages

- Unchagi
- Ghore
- Valagalli
- Talagodu
- Guddinakattu
- Abbi

Educational Institutions

- Higher Primary School, Urkeri
- Lower primary school Abbi, Urkeri
- Higher Primary School Kadavu Urkeri
- Shri Ramanatha High School Urkeri

== See also ==
- Mangalore 208 km from Urkeri
- Udupi 152 km from Urkeri
- Murudeshwara 75 km from Urkeri
- Idagunji 55 km from Urkeri
- Gokarna 38 km from urkeri
- Yana 38 km away from Urkeri and 32 km from Kumta.
