= Holanagadde =

- village
- Location in Karnataka, India Holanagadde (India)
- Coordinates: 14.453°N 74.382°E
- Country: India
- State: Karnataka
- District: Uttara Kannada

Languages
  - Official: Kannada
- Time zone: UTC+5:30 (IST)
- PIN: 581351
- Telephone code: 08386
- Vehicle registration: KA47

Holanagadde is a village in the Uttara Kannada district of the state of Karnataka, India. It is located on the west coast beach of the Arabian Sea. The main communities that live in the village are Havyakas, Namdharis, Harikanths, Patgars with a few Christian and Mukhri families. The village has a primary school which is more than 160 years old. Rice, cashew nuts, betel nuts and coconuts are the main crops. Carpentry and agriculture are the major occupations in the area.

It has fisheries industries and rice mills. Aghanashini river joins the Arabian Sea 9 km north of Holanagadde. Across the Aghanashini river, Gokarna (a Hindu pilgrimage place) is found 6km away. Kumta is located 5km south, and the chief port city Mangalore is located 206 km to the south of Holanagadde.
