= Idagunji Mahaganapati Yakshagana Mandali =

- Sri Idagunji Mahaganapati Yakshagana Mandali, Keremane (R)
- Abbreviation: SIMYM
- Formation: 1934
- Founder: Keremane Shivarama Hegde
- Headquarters: Gunavante
- Location: Honnavar, Uttara Kannada, Karnataka, India
- Official language: Kannada, Hindi, English
- Director: Keremane Shivananda Hegde
- Award: UNESCO Recognition
- Website: simym.org

Sri Idagunji Mahaganapati Yakshagana Mandali, Keremane (R)(Kannada: ಶ್ರೀ ಇಡಗುಂಜಿ ಮಹಾಗಣಪತಿ ಯಕ್ಷಗಾನ ಮಂಡಳಿ)or simply the Keremane Yakshagana Troupe or Idagunji Mela is a Yakshagana troupe based in the Uttara Kannada district of Karnataka, India. It was started by Keremane Shivarama Hegde in 1934. He is an exponent of this art form and is the first Yakshagana artist to win the Rashtrapati Award (President's Award), an award handed out by the President of India to people who excel in various fields. It is first and only UNESCO accredited Yakshagana NGO (under the 2003 Convention for the Safeguarding of the Intangible Cultural Heritage).

The troupe has survived six generations, with his children Shambu Hegde, Dr. Mahabala Hegde and Gajanana Hegde and his grand son Dr. Shivananda Hegde also being exponents of Yakshagana. Dr. Keremane Shivananda Hegde is the current director of the troupe and the institution.

== Yakshagana ==
Yakshagana is a dance drama art mostly performed in the coastal districts of the state of Karnataka (Dakshina Kannada, Udupi and Uttara Kannada districts), western parts of Shimoga district and the Kasaragod district of Kerala. This art is usually performed in the night and involves dances and dialogues with the accompaniment of music using traditional musical instruments like chande, maddale and tala. The unique aspect of the art is the use of elaborate headgear and dresses by the performers. The incidents portrayed in this art form are based on mythology and the epics. The performing troupe is called 'Mela' or 'Mandali' which is a traditional repertory and travels from place to place. A Mela or Mandali typically consists of 11-18 performing artists.

== Troupe artists ==
Idagunji Mahaganapati Yakshagana Mandali was started in the year 1934 by Keremane Shivarama Hegde, one of the exponents of the badagathittu style of Yakshagana.

=== Keremane Shivarama Hegde ===
Hegde was born in a Havyaka Brahmin family in Keremane in the Honnavar taluk of the Uttara Kannada district on 21 June 1908. He could not complete his primary education because of poverty and to earn a living he had to do odd jobs like driving a bus and booking tickets. He started performing Yakshagana from a young age of 14 and in the year 1934, he started his own troupe called as Idagunji Mahaganapati Yakshagana Mandali. The name of the troupe was chosen in honour of the Hindu God Ganapati. A famous temple of the God is located in the village of Idagunji in the Uttara Kannada district. He toured around the state of Karnataka with his troupe and started earning various awards for his efforts. He won the state award in 1965, Central Sangeet Natak Academy Award in 1970 and a Rajyotsava Award in 1985. The highest award won by him was the Rashtrapati Award. His autobiography called as Nenapina Rangasthala was recorded on cassette by G S Bhat in 1981 and published as a book by the Akshara Prakashana, Heggodu in 1996.

=== Keremane Shambhu Hegde ===
Kermane Shambhu Hegde is the son of Shivarama Hegde. He also entered the field of Yakshagana like his father and also earned various awards including the Sangeet Natak Akademi award. He brought in changes to the Yakshagana tradition by introducing truncated versions of the art form to make it more acceptable to people outside its traditional base. He established a school in his native village of Gunavante, Honnavar Taluk, to systematize Yakshagana learning. This (Shrimaya Yakshagana Kalakendra, Gunavante), even to this day, is serving as a Gurukula and nurturing upcoming yakshagana artists. He went on to become the chairman of the Karnataka Janapada (folk) and Yakshagana Academy. Some of the characters portrayed by Shambhu Hegde are that of Balarama, Jarasandha and Duryodhana. He has also acted in films and won the Karnataka State Film award for his supporting role in the Kannada film, Parva in the year 2001-2002. He was a member of the Governing body of the South Zone Cultural Centre and also was a member of Rangasamaja which looks after the working of the repertory Rangayana.

A banner indicating the performance of the Yakshagana, Indrajitu Kalaga - Ravana Vadhey by the Idagunji Mahaganapati Yakshagana Mandali

Dr. Keremane Shivananda Hegde is the son of Shambhu Hegde and is another exponent of Yakshagana. He has toured abroad with the troupe and was also invited to participate in the Asia-Pacific Performance Exchange workshop held in the University of California, Los Angeles. He has also learnt Kathak and choreography under the guidance of Kathak artist Maya Rao. He is the current director of the institution and guru at mandali's training centre- 'Srimaya Yakshagana Kalakendra, Gunavante'.

== Performances ==
Idagunji Mahaganapati Yakshagana Mandali has given performances all over India and overseas as well. Under the sponsorship of the Indian Council for Cultural Relations, the troupe undertook a tour of South East Asia in August 2000, where they gave performances in Myanmar, Singapore, Malaysia, Laos and Philippines. The troupe has also given performance in Vasantahabba 2002. They have also given performances in New York City and Atlanta.
