= Keremane Shivarama Hegde =

Indian dancer (1908–1993)

Keremane Shivarama Hegde (21 June 1908 – 1993) was an Indian dancer. He is the founder of the Yakshagana troupe Idagunji Mahaganapathi Yakshagana Mandali He is the first Yakshagana artist to receive the Rashtrapati Award (President's Award). He was given the Sangeet Natak Akademi Award for 1970.

He was born in a remote place called "Keremane" of Gunavante, in the Honnavar Taluk of Uttara Kannada District into a family of Havyaka Brahmins. Owing to the difficult times he fully embraced the art, grew with it and helped to flourish. He could not complete his primary education because of poverty and to earn a living he had to do odd jobs like driving a bus and booking tickets. He started performing Yakshagana from a young age of 14. Later, he toured around the state of Karnataka and India with his troupe and started earning various awards for his efforts. Late Annuhittalu Sadananda Hegde and the Yakshaganic aura in the locality induced the intricacies of the art form into him.

== Foundation of the Yakshagana Troupe ==
In 1934, though there was severe financial crisis in his family, he founded Idagunji Mahaganapati Yakshagana Mandali with the money that he had saved from doing other works. The Troupe was named after the family deity Lord Ganapati of Idagunji in whom he had a strong devotion. His passion towards the art and the establishment of a troupe of like minded people contributed a lot to the development of Yakshagana.

== Contributions ==
Hegde's contributions include search and encouragement of best talents, performing of traditional episodes, an effective and multidimensional depiction of a character of the Prasanga (the ‘act’) and extension of Yakshagana to wider geographical area. He was famous for the wit in his dialogues and also for slow and vivid revealing of the character in a Prasanga ('Act' or story) which is scarce in current performances.

He also used Yakshagana as a medium in the propagation of India’s freedom movement. The Yakshagana Mandali, founded by him, has proved its dynamic existence, by giving performances in various parts of the state, country and abroad. His life and contributions became a subject of research in Yakshagana. Beside stage direction and delineation of characters, Keremane Shivarama Hegde showed his skills in organisational abilities too. When he realised that the Yakshagana art will not survive solely on the support of the temple precincts, he established the idea of a professional troupe to promote the Yakshagana.

He was awarded by Central Sangeeth Nataka Academi, New Delhi (1970) and Karnataka State Award (1965) for his outstanding achievements in Yakshagana. He made many sacrifices and saw ups and downs in life at the cost of his passion, his organisation and his cultural journey. His life is an inspiration behind journey of our institution.

His autobiography “Nenapina Rangasthala” was published as a book by the Akshara Prakashana, Heggodu in the year 1996.
