= K. V. Akshara =

Indian theatre director

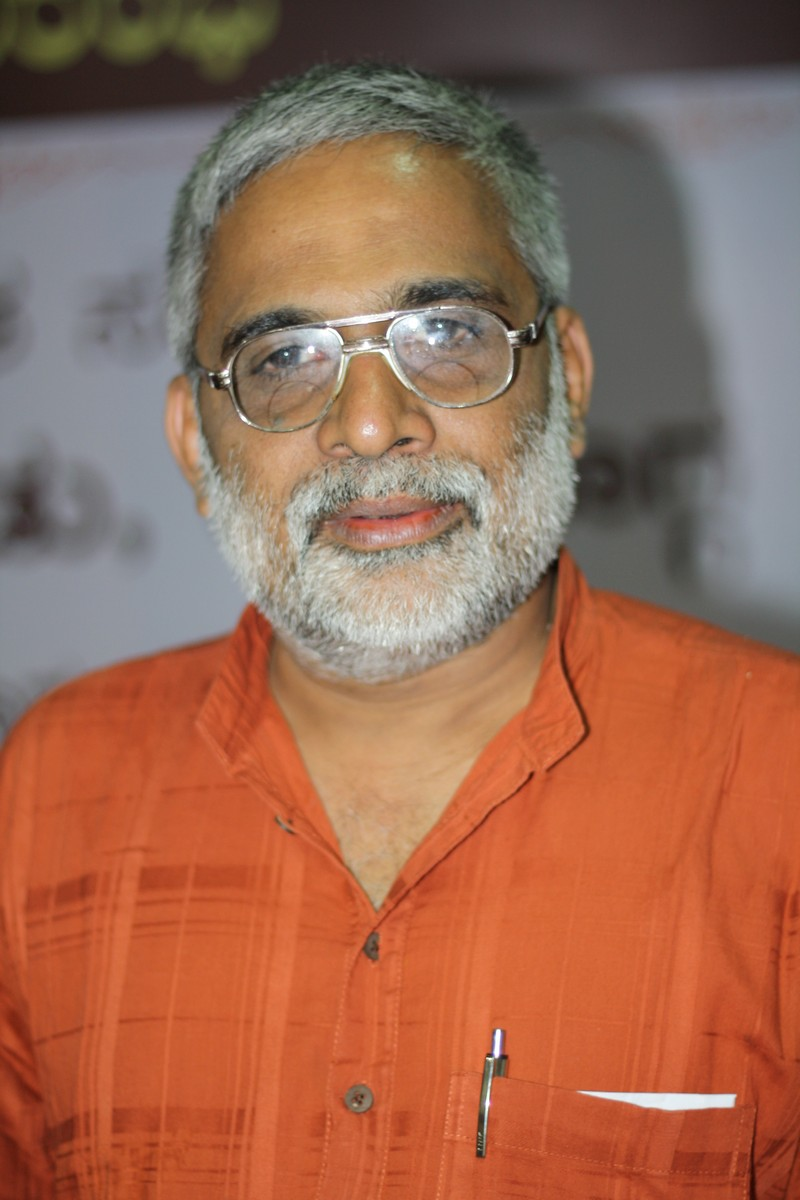
- Born: Kunthigode Vibuthi Akshara
- Occupations: writer, playwright
- Parent: K. V. Subbanna

K.V. Akshara is a director, playwright and writer in the Kannada language. He is the son of the writer K.V. Subbanna. He is a prominent figure in contemporary Kannada theatre.

Akshara presently heads Ninasam, the theatre group and cultural complex in Heggodu, Karnataka, founded by his father. He is also the treasurer of "Ninasam" society.

== Early life and education ==
After attending primary education at Heggodu village and Sagar town, he studied theatre at National School of Drama, New Delhi and at Workshop Theatre, University of Leeds in the United Kingdom.

== Awards and recognitions ==
- Sangeet Natak Akademi award
- Karnataka Sahitya Academy award
- Karnataka Nataka Academy fellowship

== Publications ==
K.V. Akshara has written more than 15 books in Kannada on Drama, theatre and performing arts and translated books on theatre to Kannada language. He has also translated and directed dramas written by William Shakespeare.

- Cinemada Yantrabhase, 1981 (with K V Subbanna)
- Ranga Aveeshane, 1982
- Hadiharayada Hadugalu, 1985
- Rangabhoomiya Mukhaanatra, 2008, 2010
- Ranga Prapancha, 2010
- Swayamvaraloka
- Sahyadri Kanda
