= Gangadharendra Saraswati =

Hindu guru

Sri Gangadharendra Saraswati
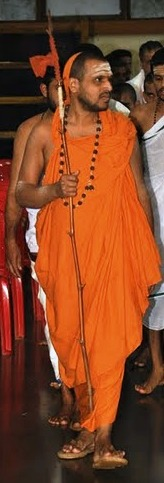

Religious life
- Religion: Hinduism
- Philosophy: Advaita Vedanta
- Sect: Shree Swarnavalli Matha, Sonda, Karnataka, India

Religious career
- Predecessor: Shri Sarwajnendra Saraswati
- Successor: Shri Anandabodhendra Saraswati

Shri Gangadharendra Saraswati, officially Shreemajjagadguru Shri Gangadharendra Saraswati Swamij, is pontiff (Guru) of Shri Sonda Swarnavalli Mutt, Sirsi, Karnataka, India. He is the 54th Guru of this mutt. He took sannyasa and ordination from Shri Jayendra Saraswathi Mahaswamiji of Kanchi Matha which is known as Kanchi kamakoti Peetham. He is a follower of Advaita Vedanta.

== Early life ==
Before his initiation, Shree Swamiji was known as Veda Vidvan Shri Parameshvara Bhat and he was a Havyaka Brahmin. The swamiji ascended the holy seat as Head of Sonda Swarnavalli Samsthanam (Swarnavalli Math) on 2 February 1991, at the age of 23.

== Gita Campaign ==
He is well known for leading and guiding the 'Bhagavad Gita Abhiyaan' – a campaign for promotion of Bhagawad Gita all over in the state Karnataka and in Kasaragod of Kerala. The Government of Karnataka has openly supported this campaign by supposedly issuing orders to teach Bhagawad Gita as a part of this campaign in all the schools controlled by the Government. On 14 July 2011, the Primary and Secondary Education Minister Vishweshwar Hegde Kageri said that those opposing the Gita teaching should quit India. He said teaching the said holy book was necessary to inculcate moral values in students. Later former Higher Education Minister of Government of Karnataka V. S. Acharya also supported Mr. Kageri by saying the programme should not be seen as religious teaching and there is no connection between Bhagavad Gita and religion. Gita has more to do with human values. Finally the Government of Karnataka has temporarily withdrawn the said order after facing stiff opposition from minority communities by religion.

According to Swamiji the Bhagawad Gita is the panacea for all the major problems afflicting the country and the humanity. It conditions the mind to face any eventuality, by offering solutions for every situation and it can cure stress and depression.

== Environmentalism ==
He is popularly known as Green Swamiji for his environmentalism and environmental conservation works.

In the year 2002, Shri Swamiji has toured the entire Uttara Kannada district, to mobilise the people for taking up a massive afforestation programme, with due co-operation from the Forest Department. As a result, more than five lakh saplings of different varieties were planted throughout the district.

He is known for leading the moment against construction of additional units in the Kaiga Atomic Power Station citing environmental issues.

He also said to have opposed functioning of all the four units of the Kaiga Atomic Power Station and demanded immediate shut down until the health survey by the Tata Memorial Centre proved that the plant does not cause any health hazard. The Erstwhile Western Ghat Task Force, an apex body for the protection of Western Ghats of Government of Karnataka was also said to have supporting the swamiji. He is also leader of Kali Valley environment awareness campaign and head of the Bedti-Aghanashini Valley Protection-Committee.

== Other activities ==
He is also said to be an active participant in the movement against Alcoholism He is also said to be a strong supporter of areca growers and known to popularise organic farming.

== Awards ==
The prestigious "Parisara Shree" award of the year 2010–2011 given by Government of Karnataka has been awarded to Shree Gangadharendra Saraswati Swamiji of Swarnavalli Mutt in recognition of his environment conservation works.
