= K. V. Subbanna =

Indian dramatist (1932–2005)

K.V. Subbanna
- Born: 20 February 1932; Heggodu, Sagara, Karnataka, India
- Died: 16 July 2005 (aged 73); Heggodu, Sagara, Karnataka
- Occupations: Playwright, theatre, writer,
- Children: K. V. Akshara
- Writing career
- Genre: Fiction
- Literary movement: Navya

Kuntagodu Vibhuthi Subbanna (20 February 1932 – 16 July 2005) was an acclaimed dramatist and writer in Kannada. He was the founder of the world-famous NINASAM (Neelanakantheshwara Natya Sangha) drama institute. Founded in 1949 in Heggodu, Sagara. Ninasam, under the guidance of K.V. Subbanna, made significant contribution to Kannada theatre and other performing arts. He was awarded, in 1991, the Ramon Magsaysay Award for Journalism, Literature, and Creative Communication Arts, in recognition of his contribution to enrich rural Karnataka with the world's best films and the delight and wonder of the living stage. He was awarded the Padma Shri in 2004.

== Early life ==
He was born in Mundigesara to parents who were Havyaka Brahmins. He then went to Mysore to do his B.A.(Hons.) in Kannada Literature at the University of Mysore, where he had such acclaimed teachers as Kuvempu and S.V. Parameshwara Bhatta and U.R. Anantha Murthy as a fellow-student. After his degree he returned to his village to continue his family profession in areca farming.

Under the influence of Shantaveri Gopala Gowda, a senior leader of the socialist movement in Karnataka, Subbanna espoused socialist ideology, to which he was committed throughout his life. To promote Kannada dramas Subbanna set up training centres in various parts of Karnataka. He also established Akshara Prakashana, a publishing house, to publish literature in Kannada related to theatre, which included translations of plays from other languages. His son K. V. Akshara is also a playwright.

== Awards and recognition ==
- Ramon Magsaysay Award in 1991
- Sangeet Natak Akademi Award in 1994
- Sahitya Akademi Award in 2003
- Padma Shree in 2004
