= R. N. Shetty =

Indian businessman and philanthropist (1928–2020)

- Born: Rama Nagappa Shetty; 15 August 1928; Murudeshwar, North Canara, British India
- Died: 17 December 2020 (aged 92); Bangalore, Karnataka, India
- Occupation: Entrepreneur
- Spouse: Sudha Shetty
- Children: 7
- Website: https://rnshetty.com/

Rama Nagappa Shetty (15 August 1928 – 17 December 2020) was an Indian entrepreneur and philanthropist. He was the owner of R N Shetty Group of companies, including RNS Infrastructure, RNS Maruti Suzuki (RNS Motors), Murudeshwar Ceramics, Naveen Hotels and Murudeshwar Power. He was the chairman of a chain of educational institutions under the R N Shetty Trust. He was a recipient of the Karnataka state government's Rajyotsava Award in 2004.

== Early life ==
Shetty was born on 15 August 1928, in the coastal town of Murdeshwar, in the present-day Uttara Kannada district of Karnataka into a family of farmers. His father was the Muktesar (Hereditary Administrator) of the Murudeshwar Temple dedicated to the Hindu God Shiva. After completing high school education, Shetty started his career as a civil contractor in Sirsi. Recounting his early days, Shetty is noted to have said that this choice was driven by the fact that back in those days there were no colleges in Sirsi for him to continue his studies.

== Career ==
In 1961, Shetty formed the R N Shetty & Company, a civil engineering and construction company. The company took up public infrastructure buildings including bridges on the Honnavar–Bangalore road. In 1966, he shifted base from his native Uttara Kannada district to Hubli, in the northern Karnataka.

In 1967, he formed Naveen Mechanised Construction Company with seven other civil contractors. The company bid for the construction of the Hidkal dam in Belgaum district. However, when the company experienced large financial losses, Shetty bought his partners' shares and took over the company. In the following eight years, the company executed infrastructure projects across hydropower, irrigation, and bridges, that improved the company's financial position. Projects included the Hidkal dam, Supa reservoir, and the Gerusoppa hydel power project, all within the state of Karnataka. He also built tunnels for the Konkan Railway project and canals for the Upper Krishna Project. His company was awarded the Belgaum Bypass and Dharwad–Belgaum roadworks projects by National Highways Authority of India and roadworks at Maski in Raichur district by Karnataka State Highways Improvement Project.

In 1975, he entered the hospitality sector, through Naveen Hotels Limited. He built a five-star hotel in Bangalore that was leased out to Taj Group and branded as Taj MG Road Hotel in Bangalore. The group went on to build two additional hotels in Karnataka, Hotel Naveen in Hubli and the RNS Yatrinivas resort in Murudeshwar. A five star hotel was later built in Bangalore and is leased to the Taj group and operated as Taj Yeshwantpur Hotel.

He set up a manufacturing unit to manufacture Mangalore tiles in 1977. Murudeshwar Tiles went on to be one of the largest Mangalore-tile units in the state. In 1981, he set up Naveen Structurals and Engineering focused on skilled fabrication for the construction industry. In 1987, he set up Murudeshwar Ceramics to manufacture glazed ceramic tiles with manufacturing facilities in Hubli and Karaikal in Puducherry.

In 1993, Shetty entered the power sector, setting up Murudeshwar Power Corporation which built a mini hydel power project in 1999, with a commissioned capacity of 11.6 MW at Narayanpur Left Bank Canal in Bijapur district.

His company RNS Motors established automobile showrooms for Maruti Udyog in Hubli in 1995 and in Bangalore in 1998.

== Philanthropy ==
Shetty undertook philanthropic activities through the R. N. Shetty Trust, including primary and high schools, an engineering college, a nursing school, and a rural polytechnic, across Murudeshwar and Bangalore. The trust also operated hospitals and undertook rural education programs in Karnataka.

Shetty was credited with the modernisation of the temple town of Murudeshwara and transforming it into a tourist attraction. The Murdeshwar Shiva temple and temple complex was renovated by funding from Shetty. The temple held religious significance for the deity, being believed to be one of the five parts of the Atmalinga, which according to Hindu mythology, broke when the demon king Ravana tricked the elephant-god Ganesha into handing it over to him while performing his daily prayers, Sandhyavandanam. The Raja Gopura, with a height of 237.5 feet (72 m) is considered the tallest Gopuram in the world and the statue of Shiva, at 123 feet (37 m), considered the largest in the world, were built using funding from Shetty.

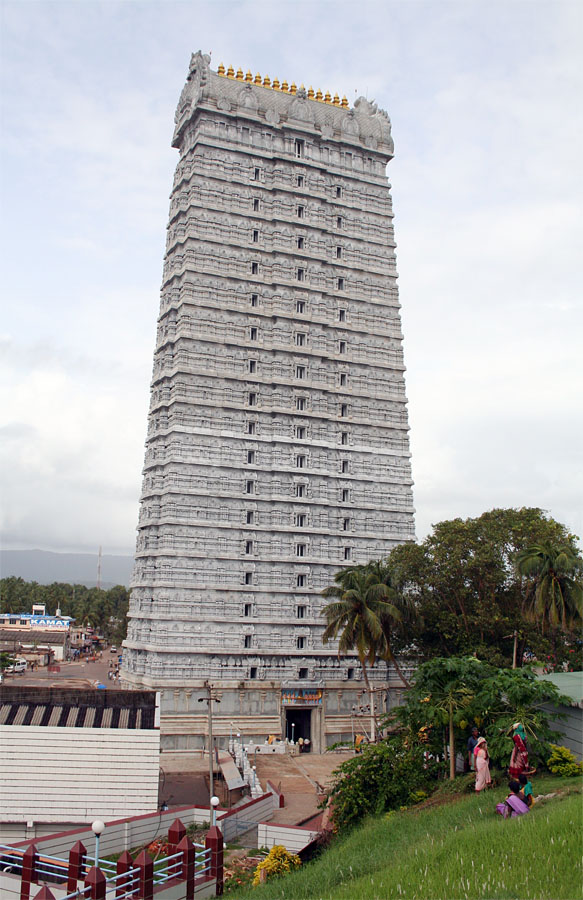
The Gopuram in Murudeshwara

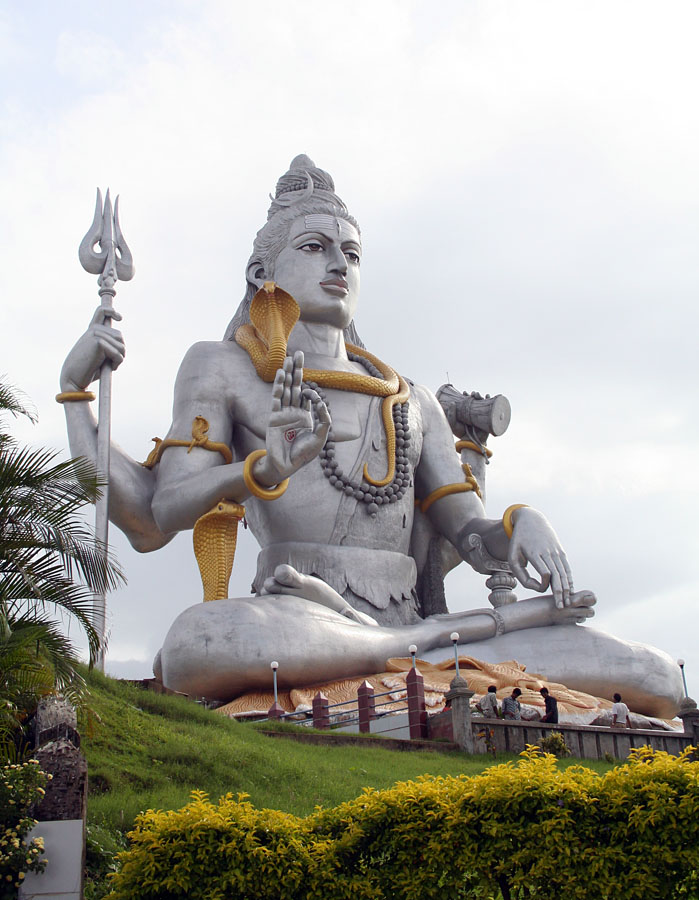
The Shiva statue in Murudeshwara

== Awards and recognition ==
Bangalore University awarded an Honorary Doctorate to Shetty in 2009 and in 2004 he received the Visvesvaraya Memorial Award from the Federation of Karnataka Chambers of Commerce and Industry. He was a recipient of the Karnataka Government's Rajyotsava award in 2004.

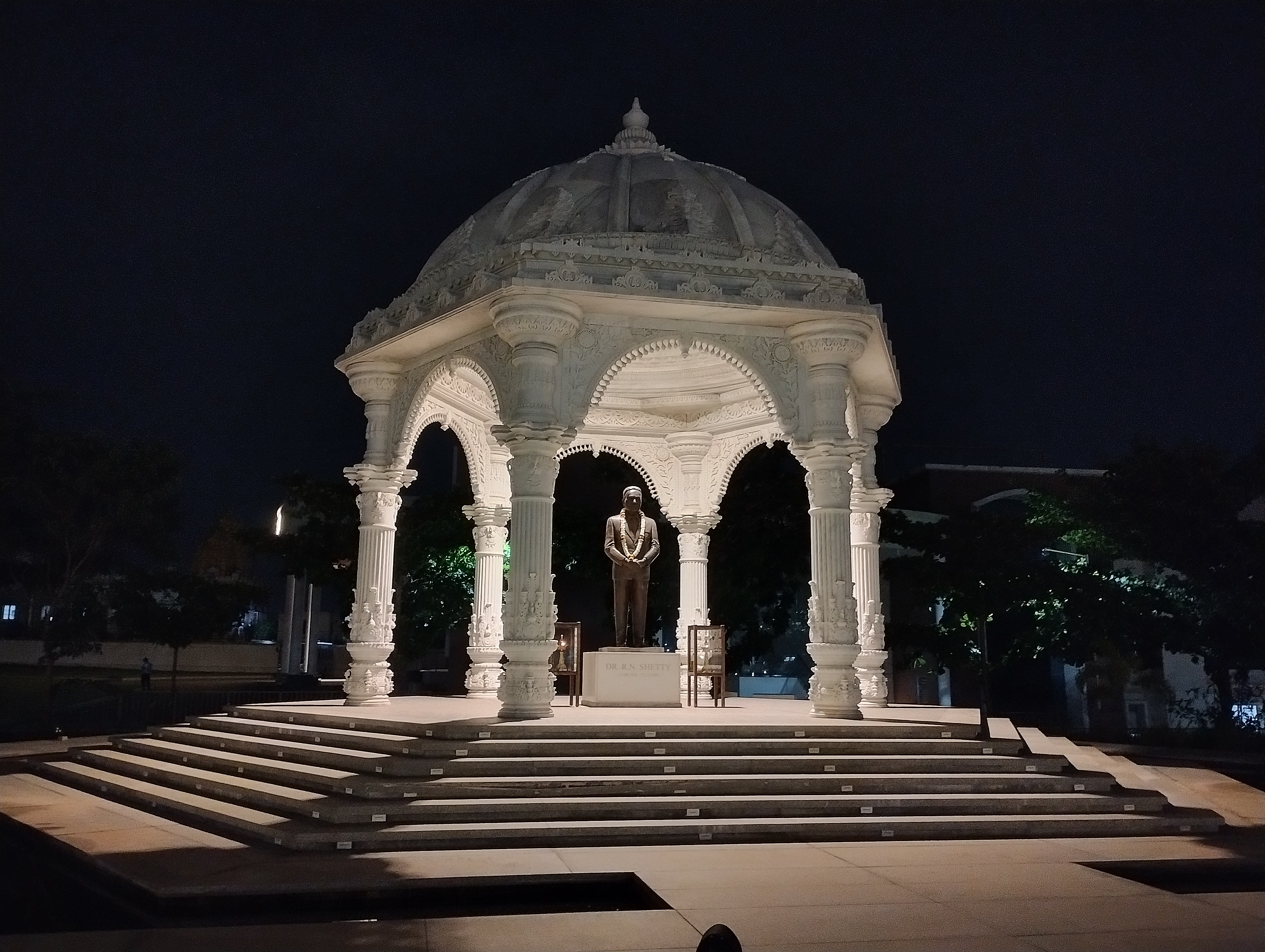
R. N. Shetty memorial at RNS Institute of Technology, Bangalore

== Personal life ==
Shetty was married to Sudha Shetty and had three sons and four daughters. He died on 17 December 2020 in Bangalore of a cardiac arrest. He was aged 92.
