= Heggodu =

- village
- Location in Karnataka, India Heggodu (India)
- Coordinates: 14.098883°N 75.070731°E
- Country: India
- State: Karnataka
- Location: Sagar, Karnataka

Government
  - Body: Gram panchayat

Languages
  - Official: Kannada
- Time zone: UTC+5:30 (IST)
- ISO 3166 code: IN-KA
- Vehicle registration: KA
- Website: karnataka.gov.in

Heggodu is a village located in the Sagar Taluk of Karnataka. It is a very important cultural and educational hub in South India, because of the organizations at this place.

== Institutes ==
Apart from a pre-university and an undergraduate degree college, this place also has a drama institute, Ninasam which is the brain child of the renowned dramatist, K. V. Subbanna.

== Organizations ==
=== Ninasam ===
A drama institute, Currently headed by Akshara K V, focuses on drama, films and literature. It hosts a multiple programs and workshops throughout the year to strengthen and develop the South Indian drama culture.

=== Akshara Prakashana ===
A Kannada publishing house. It thrives to reduce the barrier between artists and literature by publication of many books and translations of stage-play at affordable price. It also publishes make-ups, educational and informational related books.

=== Charaka ===
headed by B. Prasanna, It focuses on design and promotion of khadi wears and improvement of the economical state of the workers.

== Travel ==
This place is very near to Sagar and hence it is well connected by both rail and road. This place also has local bus facilities for travelling to nearest places like Sagar, Hosanagara etc.

== See also ==
- Hosanagara
- Sagar
- Jog Falls
- Rangayana
- Ramachandrapura Math
