= Havyaka Brahmins =

Regions with significant populations
- Indian state of Karnataka

Languages
- Havyaka Kannada, Sanskrit

Religion
- Hinduism

Havyaka Brahmin, originally called Havika Brahmana, is a Hindu Brahmin community native to the districts of Shivamogga, Uttara Kannada, Dakshina Kannada, Kodagu / Coorg, coastal Karnataka and the Kasaragod district of Kerala. Havyakas fall under the Pancha-Dravida Brahmin category. They are primarily followers of the Yajurveda, but some of them follow the Rigveda and Samaveda Shakas as well. They follow the Advaita philosophy of Adi Shankaracharya.

== Etymology and origin ==
The word, as attested by linguist Sediyapu Krishna Bhat, is derived from Ahichchatra Brāhmaṇa. It was changed to Ahika and then Havika, and was agreed upon by scholars like Sediyapu and Nadahalli Ranganatha Sharma. The term Ahichatra Brāhmaṇa is mentioned in inscriptions. Another etymology that is popular for Havyaka is argued to have derived from the Sanskrit word havya, which means "sacred oblation". Thus, Havyaka could mean "performer of Havana rituals". However, according to Shri Sediyapu Krishna Bhat, the word "Havyaka" is a Sanskritization of Ahika-Havika. They are referred to as "Haviga" in colonial-era documents by British ethnographers. Some variations of this name are "Haiga" and "Havika"; "Haiga" is also the name of the region that is centered around Gokarna and is bounded by Tulu Nadu to the south; this region is also called Parashuramakshethra, Gorastradesha or Gokarnamandala. Sanskrit scholar Mahamahopadhyaya Nadahalli Ranganatha Sharma rejects the Havya + kavya derivation as grammatically incorrect. The word Havyaka was not used in official records until 1928, including mathas.

Havyakas are descended from Brahmins brought from Ahichchatra by King Mayurasharman who founded the Kadamba dynasty in Kuntala. These Brahmins were originally from the Ahichchatra kingdom near the modern-day Ramnagar village in the modern-day Bareilly district in Uttar Pradesh. They were brought in order to perform Vedic rituals especially the Ashwamedha and were originally housed in Talagunda Agrahara near Soraba and Shiralakoppa towns where the inscription attesting to this fact is found. Banavasi, which is 24 kilometers from Sirsi was the capital but Mayuraverma was born in the Talagunda Agrahara. From there, they spread out in the nearby regions primarily following areas which were suitable for areca nut plantations, which they have historically been involved in Thimmappa Kalasi, Vidwan (2012). Havyakara Itihasa [The history of Havyakas] (in Kannada).

Some claims suggest that the Havyakas originated from the Banavasi region and migrated to Ahichachtra (present-day Uttar Pradesh) in response to the threat posed by non-Vedic sects. Centuries ago, Kadambara Mayuravarman, the founder of Karnataka's first royal family, struggled to carry out his religious rituals due to the lack of Brahmins in those days. Therefore, he invited Havyaka families from Ahichachtra to perform Ashwamedha, provided shelter to some villages, and facilitated their settlement. When the Havyakas were concerned about their protection when they came to the Kadamba kingdom, the Kadamba king gave the Haigunda region of the Sharavati shore, which is an island in the midst of the Sharavati River, to the Havyakas so as not to disturb the Vedic works. Sri Ramachandrapura Mutt, one of the most famous gurupeeths, has recently taken charge of Haigunda temple, renovated it under the guidance of Sri Sri Raghaveshwar Bharati Swami, and performs religious programs on special occasions like Navratri.

== Geographic distribution ==
Havyakas are native to the Soraba (ancient town of Surabhipura), Sagara in Shimoga, Uttara Kannada and the Dakshina Kannada districts of Karnataka and the Kasaragod district of Kerala. A smaller percentage can also be found in the Hosanagara, Shivamogga and Thirthahalli taluks in Shivamogga, Chikmagalur and Kodagu districts. They are found in Sirsi, Siddapura, Yellapura, Kumta and Honnavar in Uttara Kannada; in Puttur and Sullia in Dakshina Kannada and in the northern parts of the Kasaragod district such as Kumbla Thimmappa Kalasi, Vidwan (2012). Havyakara Itihasa [The history of Havyakas] (in Kannada)..

== Notable people ==
- Raghuram Bhat, Ex-Cricketer, President Karnataka State Cricket Association
- Vishweshwar Bhat, Journalist, ex-Editor-in-chief Kannada Prabha, Rajyotsava Awardee.
- Urimajalu Ram Bhat, Politician/MLA, Educationist, Co-founder of Vivekananda Degree College, ex-Chairman of Campco
- Keremane Shivarama Hegde, Yakashagana artist/dancer, Sangeet Natak Academy Awardee, 1st Yakshagana artist to win Rashtrapati Award
- Anantkumar Hegde, Indian politician and Member of Parliament for Uttara Kannada constituency.
- Chittani Ramachandra Hegde, Yakshagana artist. Padma Shri, Rajyotsava Prashasti awardee.
- Ramakrishna Hegde, former Chief Minister of Karnataka.
- Vishweshwar Hegde Kageri, Indian politician and 22nd speaker of the Karnataka Legislative Assembly.
- Shashidhar Kote, Singer, Musician, Teacher.
- Thimmappaiah Madiyal, former Director-General and Inspector-General of Police
- Diganth Manchale, Actor.
- Neernalli Ramakrishna, Actor.
- Abhaya Simha, film director and screenwriter
- K. V. Subbanna, Founder of Ninasam, Padma Shri, Sahitya Academy, Sangeet Natak and Ramon Magsasay Awardee.
- Anant Krishna Shastry, Indian historian and Professor.
- Vidyamadhava, 14th century scholar and astronomer from Gunavante, writer of Vidya Madhaveeyam or Muhurta Madhaviyam with introducing several important systems in astrology and mathematics.

== Rituals ==
Males undergo the Upanayana to initiate their Vedic studies. It is also known as Brahmopadesha. The key ritual during Upanayana is that of putting a sacred thread called yajnopavitha or janivaara consisting of three cotton strands across the left shoulder to the right waist of the boy. The initiate is called a dvija "twice-born" and is expected to perform the Sandhyavandana at least twice daily. Yajnopavitha has a special knot in it which is called as "Brahma Gantu". Havyaka Brahmins also undergo the Upakarma, where the sacred thread is changed.

In old Vedas, it is mentioned that after Upanayana, the boy enters the stage of Brahmacharya ashrama, leading a celibate and austere life of a student in his teacher's home and eating from handouts given by the neighbours. When he has accomplished his studies of the Vedas, he enters the Grahastha ashram, as a married man, becoming head of his household. During the wedding, the groom wears two janivaaras at the same time to signify his marriage.

== Language ==
The Havyakas are united by their language, known as Havigannada, which is a dialect of Kannada. There are two distinct dialects of the Havyaka language. One in Uttara Kannada and Shivamogga districts and another in Dakshina Kannada and Kasaragodu districts. The dialect differs from mainstream Kannada; non-Havyakas who understand and speak Kannada cannot usually understand Havigannada.

Most Havyakas also understand mainstream Kannada (particularly, the Havyakas living in Bangalore, who speak Bangalore Kannada outdoors and Havigannada at home); the Havyakas who are native to Dakshina Kannada also understand Tulu and those from Kasaragod speak Havigannada at home and Malayalam outdoors. Havyakas who are settled in Goa and Karwar understand and speak Konkani. Apart from this, many of them, especially those living in metropolitan cities, can speak Hindi and English.

== Havyaka cuisine ==
The Havyakas follow a lacto-vegetarian diet. Compared to the cuisines of other communities of South India, Havyaka cuisine is milder and less spicy. Rice, curds, buttermilk and vegetables are the staples used in Havyaka cuisine. Coconut is used in a lot of dishes. Some popular Havyaka dishes include:

- Thambuli: A dish of chopped vegetables with curd or buttermilk and a seasoning of spices fried in oil.
- Sasime: A dish prepared with the ground paste of any vegetable along with curd and a seasoning of spices fried in oil.
- Appe huli: A sour and tangy watery soup made from unripe mangoes and chilly.
- Patrode: A dish made of colocasia leaves.
- Melara: Mild coconut-yogurt curry which can be made using various vegetables.

Curries are prepared from unripe jackfruits, the ripe jackfruit is used to cook items such as dosas and halvas.

== See also ==
- Shivalli Brahmins
- Gowda Saraswat Brahmins
