= Idagunji =

- village
- Location in Karnataka, India
- Coordinates: 14.35°N 74.7°E
- Country: India
- State: Karnataka
- Region: Kanara
- District: Uttara Kannada
- Taluk: Honnavar

Languages
  - Official: Kannada
- Time zone: UTC+5:30 (IST)
- Postal code: 581423

Idagunji is a small village in Honnavar Taluk, in the Uttara Kannada district of Karnataka state, India.

It is a famous place of Hindu pilgrimage and worship.

== Geography ==
Idugunji is close to Manki and Gunavante and about 14 km from Honnavar, in Honnavar Taluk; and 18.8 km from Murudeshwara.

== Ganesha Temple ==
The Shree Vinayaka Devaru (Kannada:ಗಣಪತಿ ಇಡಗುಂಜಿ) is a Hindu temple dedicated to the god Ganesha (Vinayaka), located on the West Coast of India in the Idagunji town in Uttara Kannada district in Karnataka state, India. The temple's popularity as a religious place is recorded by about 1 million devotees visiting it annually.

It is one of the six famous Ganesha temples on the west Coast of India, which is also popularly called the "Ganesha Coast".

Sri Idagunji Mahaganapati Yakshagana Mandali, Keremane (R) is a Yakshagana repertory and art organisation named after Lord Ganesha of Idagunji, located in the nearby village of Gunavante. It is first and only UNESCO accredited Yakshagana NGO (under the 2003 Convention for the Safeguarding of the Intangible Cultural Heritage).

== See also ==
- Karwar
- Mangalore
- Gunavante
- Murudeshwara
- Gokarna
