= Thambuli =

Indian food

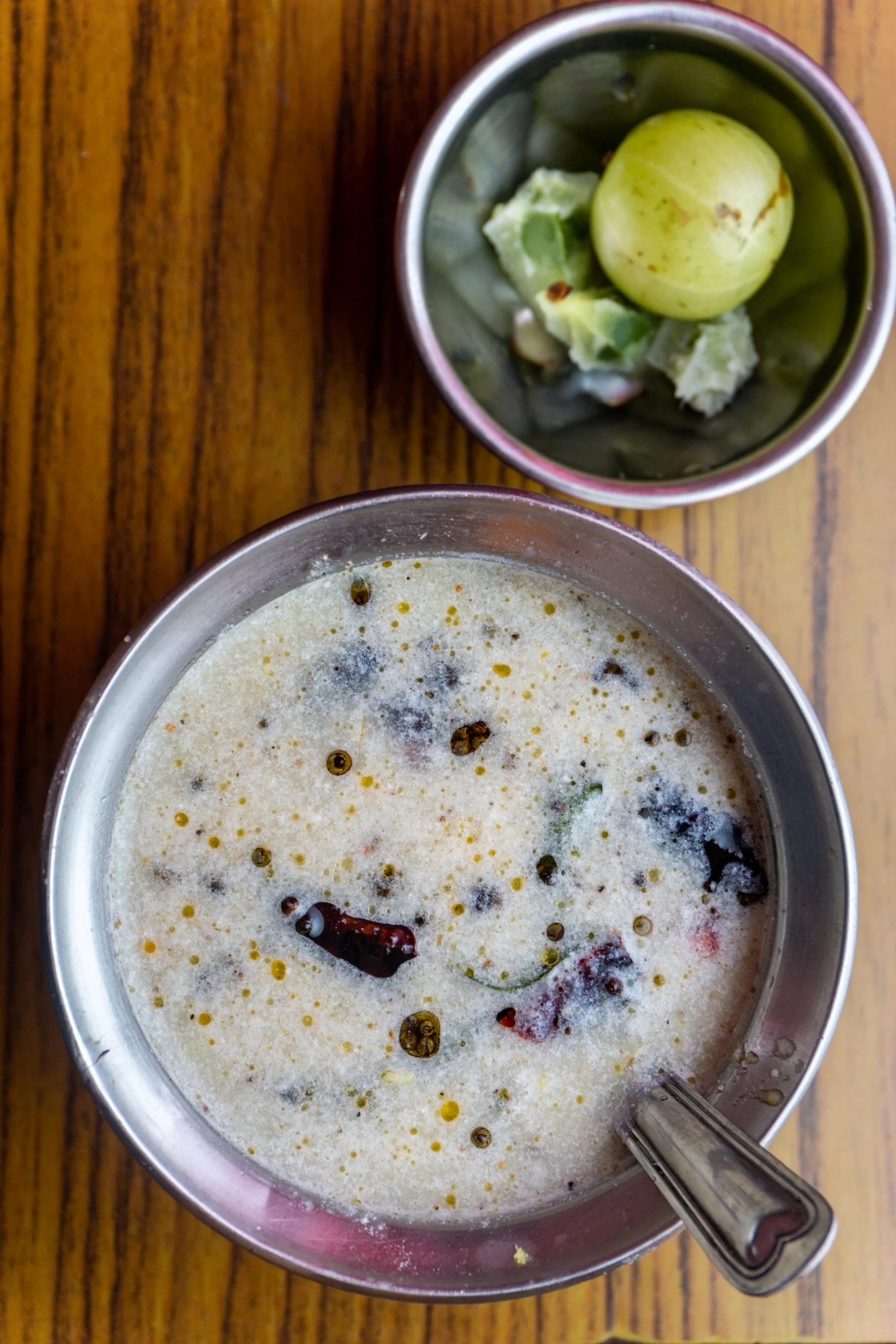
Nellikayi thambuli

Thambuli is a type of buttermilk eaten in the Indian state of Karnataka. Thambuli, being a curd based cuisine, is consumed with rice. Tambuli is derived from Kannada word thampu. (ತಂಪು+ಹುಳಿ ---->ತಂಬುಳಿ). Thampu meaning cool/cold. So thambuli is a cooling food. It is made mostly from many greens and carrot, beetroot like vegetables as their main ingredients. It is prepared by grinding the vegetable with the spices and then mixing it with yogurt. All ingredients are used raw, (as they are) without any cooking.

Thambuli/Tambli/Tambuli is a form of raita. There are many varieties of Thumbuli: Menthe Thumbuli, shunti (ginger) thaumbuli, and various other herbal thambulis. The herbal thambuli is prepared with leaves like Basale soppu, kaki kudi soppu, doddapatre soppu (all of them herbs grown all over Karnataka).

Many different seasonal vegetables/herbs can be used in the preparation of thambulis, such as doddapatre leaves (ajwain leaves/karibevu leaves), coriander leaves, poppy seeds, curry leaves and so on. Various recipes for the same exist, with slight variations in the ingredients, which leads to different color variations based on the ingredient (s). Thambuli/Tambli is generally prepared mild and not spicy, with some having visible amounts of seasoning. Fundamentally, thambuli/tambli has a few simple whole spices, roasted and ground with seasonal vegetables or herbs (some with coconut) added to buttermilk/curds. Tambuli is another authentic Karnataka recipe, and is often served in many functions across coastal karnataka. Tambuli (or Thambuli) is generally of many types and of many ingredients. A few examples are given below :-

- Garlic Tambuli
- Mint Tambuli
- Moringa Tambuli
- Hibiscus Tambuli (it has a slight pink color with a slightly sweet taste)
- Orange Peel Tambuli (is visibly orange and exudes an orange scent and taste and has a very rough texture due to the copious amounts of fibre present)
- Pomegranate Peel Tambuli etc.
