= Ninasam =

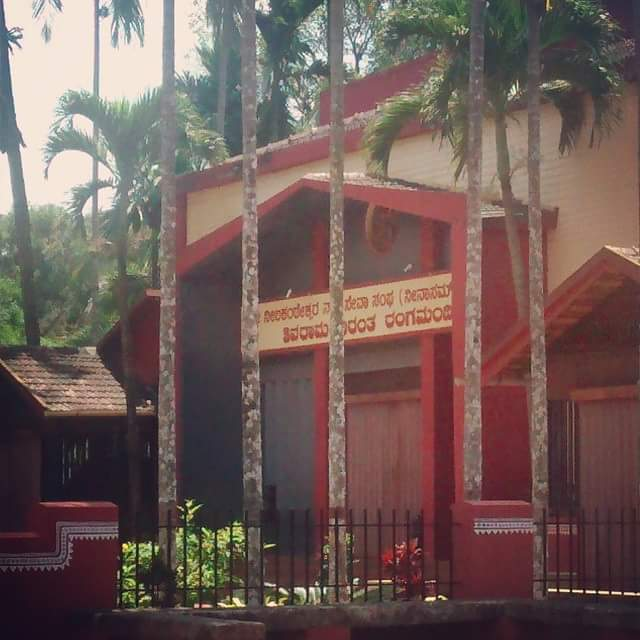
The proscenium at Ninasam

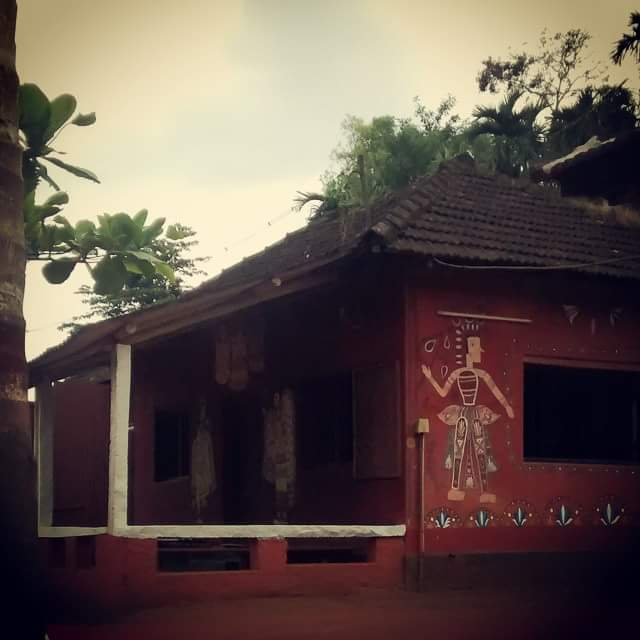
The Ninasam office at Heggodu

Ninasam (Kannada: ನೀನಾಸಂ) is a cultural organisation located in the village of Heggodu in Sagar Taluk of the Shivamogga district in the state of Karnataka, India. Ninasam (also spelt as Neenasam) is the short form of Sri NIlakanteshwara NAtyaseva SANgha, an organisation dedicated to the growth of drama, films and publishing. Akshara, the current head of Ninasam, tells a story where Ni means you, Na means me, and Sam is a pun on the English word Sum, and in music is the moment where rhythm comes together. Ninasam was the brainchild of the renowned dramatist and Magsaysay award winner, K V Subbanna. As he said, it is the communitarian activity. Ninasam works similarly to a co-operative society. Currently A R Shreedhara Bhatt, a retired revenue officer, is the president, and K V Akshara, the son of Subbanna, is the director.

== History ==
The origin of Ninasam occurred in 1945 in Heggodu, when Subbanna and his friends started to get together in the evenings to exchange views and discuss about the politics and other current issues. After Indian Independence in 1947, this group of boys started a library and also launched a newspaper called The Ashoka Weekly with a circulation of 500. It was printed on a cyclostyle machine and carried articles related to local and national events. This group also started producing small plays and in 1949, they formed the cultural group Ninasam, with the name dedicated to the native Hindu god of Heggodu, Nilakanteshwara. Subbanna's father was the first president and the initial plays staged were those related to the Hindu epics, Ramayana and Mahabharata. After his graduation from Mysore University, Subbanna returned to Heggodu and started producing plays at Ninasam that included Kannada translations of works by Shakespeare, Molière and Brecht, and also those of Kannada writers. Since 1987, Ninasam has been coming out with a quarterly house journal.

== Akshara Prakashana ==
Akshara Prakashana was started by K.V. Subbanna, in 1957, as a tiny private publishing outlet, to publish his own writings. Soon, it started publishing upcoming new writers of the time and identified itself with the ‘modernist’ Navya movement of the 1950s and 1960s. The journal Saakshi that Akshara Prakashana published from 1968 to 1978 provided a voice to that historic literary development. By 1975, Akshara Prakashana became a widely known organisation. It was reconstituted as a private trust and has since been running under Akshara Trust. K.V. Subbanna was its sole trustee until 2005, and Akshara K.V. has been its chief since then. Between 1957 and 2011, Akshara Prakashana published more than 50,000 pages of literature, and several prominent writers and thinkers have joined with it. The publication has been working as a non-profit-oriented concern and has so far published more than 800 books, the subjects of which include literature, theatre, cinema, culture studies, philosophy and humanities. Though a separate organisation, Akshara Prakashana has been working in coordination with Ninasam, supporting Ninasam's activities with relevant publications. Some of the works published included those by T.P. Ashok and U.R. Anantha Murthy. In 2013, Akshara Prakashana has started a website where people can buy its books.

== Ninasam Chitrasamaja ==
Having explored the areas of theatre and publishing, Subbanna wanted to explore the cinema world and attended a film appreciation course in 1967 at Pune. On his return he decided to start screening films at Ninasam and started Ninasam Chitrasamaja, an organisation formed to encourage the film culture and also to hold film festivals. A film appreciation course was started with subjects including film history, film techniques, film theory, film criticism, art films and popular cinema. Films that were staged included those by masters like Satyajit Ray, Ingmar Bergman and Akira Kurosawa. The films and plays being staged by Ninasam started to attract audiences from all over Karnataka and its popularity grew considerably.

== Janaspandana ==
The popularity of Ninasam prompted the Ford Foundation to sponsor a project called Janaspandana whereby similar film festivals, plays and appreciation courses were to be organised in other areas of Karnataka. This project ended in 1985 but the activities have continued. It is estimated that about 200 thousand people were exposed to cinema and around 5000 people were exposed to the appreciation courses. As a result of Janaspandana, 37 workshops in a duration of 6 weeks were held in the field of theater and this yielded around 50 productions. Theater equipment banks were set up in different regions of Karnataka to serve the needs of the theater groups in that region.

== Ninasam Theatre Institute ==
In 1980, Ninasam also started a theater institute to offer courses on theater to interested candidates. It offers a 10-month-long diploma course to about 20 students every year. As part of these courses, around 130 theatre productions have resulted. Visiting faculty to this institute include Shivaram Karanth, Chandrashekhara Kambara, K. N. Panikkar, Fritz Bennewitz, Sankar Venkateswaran and Götz Leineweber. Some of the alumni of this institute join Ninasam's rural theatre repertory troupe, Tirugata.

== ತಿರುಗಾಟ ==
ತಿರುಗಾಟ (travelling around in Kannada) is a theatre troupe started by Ninasam, established in 1985. This troupe travels to different places and stages plays mainly to a rural audience. Apparently, in the first 11 years of its existence, Tirugata travelled 82,000 km to 172 places and staged 1546 plays for an audience of about 1.1 million. It is mostly a self-sustaining group, with only 20% of total revenue coming as a grant from the Government.

== Notable alumni ==
- Achyuth Kumar
- Sathish Ninasam
- Darshan Thoogudeepa
- Shabareesh das (serial drama director)
- Jeevanram sullia
