= Urimajalu Ram Bhat =

Indian politician (1928/29–2021)

Urimajalu K. Rama Bhat (born 1928 or 1929 - died 6 December 2021) was an Indian politician, educationist who had served as the Member of Karnataka Legislative Assembly from Puttur Assembly constituency for two-terms. He also served as a former chairman of Central Arecanut and Cocoa Marketing and Processing Co-operative Limited and was a co-founder of Sri Vivekananda Educational Society, Puttur. He was the founder member of Bharatiya Janata Party, Karnataka. He announced Swabhimani Vedike, a political party to fight Indian general elections in 2009 along with Sangh Parivar hardliners who were dumped by the BJP.

He had served as a trustee of Puttur Sri Mahalingeshwara Temple and Mentor of Vivekananda Vidyavardhaka Sangha,

== Early life ==
He was born into an undivided Havyaka family in Urimajalu near Kabak-Vittal.

== Activism ==
He was also known as the ‘Bheeshma’ of Bharatiya Janata Party. He protested against the emergency imposed by Indira Gandhi and was imprisoned due to his activism. He had taught Kannada to Lal Krishn Advani while in jail.

== Career ==
He joined Janata Party, led by Jayprakash Narayan in 1977 and found 1978 Karnataka Legislative Assembly election from Puttur Assembly constituency and successfully won the election. He then became a founding Member of the Bharatiya Janata Party, Karnataka in 1980 and fought 1983 Karnataka Legislative Assembly election from the same constituency and won it consecutively for the second time. He was succeeded by Vinay Kumar Sorake.

=== 2009 Indian general elections ===
He opposed B. S. Yediyurappa for not giving ticket to Shakuntala T. Shetty and eventually he left Bharatiya Janata Party same year after trying to reform the party through BJP elders forum, along with Anna Vinayachandra . He fought 2009 Indian general elections from Dakshina Kannada Lok Sabha constituency as an Independent candidate and supported by Swabhimani Vedike. Which he lost and managed to have 5,960 votes and got the 6th position.

== Death ==
He died at his residence in Kombettu near Puttur on 6 December 2021, at the age of 92 due to age-related illness. He was cremated with State Honours and his death was condoled by Narendra Modi and Vishweshwara Hegde Kageri.

Consoling his death, Kageri said:

"Rama Bhat's demise has brought to an end a glorious chapter in the Sangh Pariwar in particular and public life in general. I pay my humble tributes to the noble soul"

Modi said:

“In the history of the Jana Sangh and BJP, stalwarts like Urimajalu K. Rama Bhat Ji have a special place. He assiduously worked to strengthen our Party in Karnataka and served tirelessly among people. I am saddened by his demise. Condolences to his family. Om Shanti.”
