= Murdeshwar =

Town in Karnataka, India

- Village
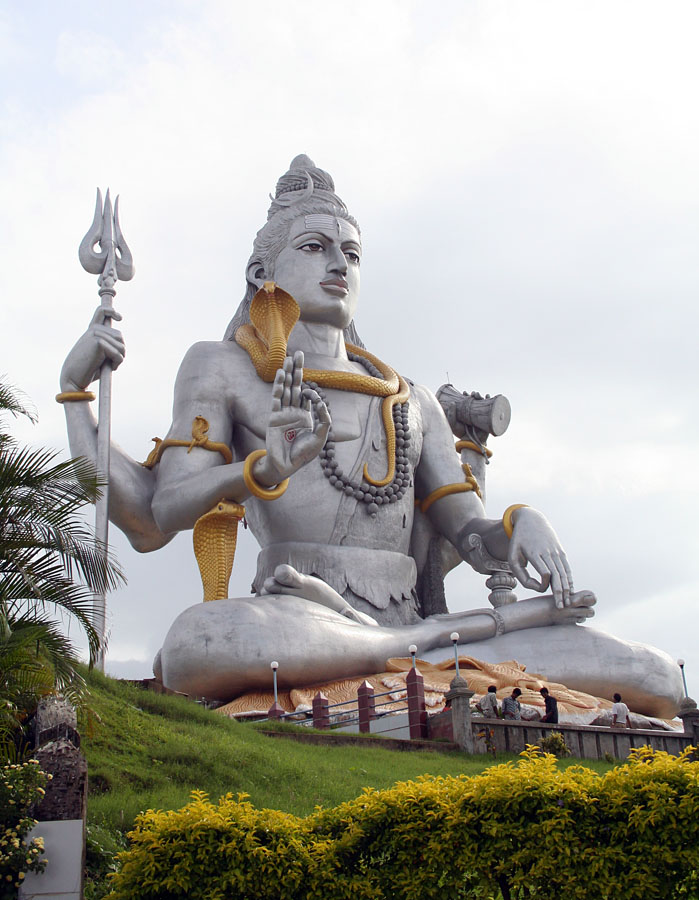
- Statue of Shiva at Murudeshwara Temple complex

- Location within Karnataka Location within India
- Coordinates: 14°5′37.02″N 74°29′1.77″E
- Country: India
- State: Karnataka
- District: Uttara Kannada
- Taluk: Bhatkal

Languages
  - Official: Kannada
- Time zone: UTC+5:30 (IST)
- PIN: 581 350
- Telephone code: 08385

Murdeshwar or Murudeshwara is a town in Uttara Kannada district in the state of Karnataka, India, and lies on the coast of the Arabian Sea. It contains the world's third tallest Shiva statue, as well as the Murudeshwara Temple. The town has a railway station on the Mangalore–Mumbai Konkan railway route.

== Etymology ==
Murudeshwara is derived from the Sanskrit terms mṛḍa (gracious) and īśvara (lord), meaning the "gracious lord"—an epithet of Shiva.

== Legend ==
According to regional legend, Ravana, the rakshasa king of Lanka, performed severe penance to please Shiva. As his boon, he requested a lingam (an aniconic form of Shiva) called the atmalinga, believed to grant its possessor immortality and immense power. Shiva agreed to bestow it on the condition that it never touch the ground before reaching its destination; once placed down, it would remain permanently rooted at that spot. Having obtained the boon, Ravana began his journey home.

Seeking to prevent Ravana from taking the atmalinga to Lanka, the devas enlisted Ganesha’s help. At Gokarna, Ganesha appeared in the guise of a Brahmin boy. Ravana entrusted the atmalinga to him while performing his evening rites. Ganesha agreed to hold it on the condition that he would call Ravana thrice before setting it down. Ganesha then called out in quick succession and placed the atmalinga on the ground, where it became immovable.

Ravana unsuccessfully attempted to lift the atmalinga and, in anger, cast away its wrappings. Murdeshwar is believed to mark the place where the cloth covering the atmalinga fell.

== Major attractions ==
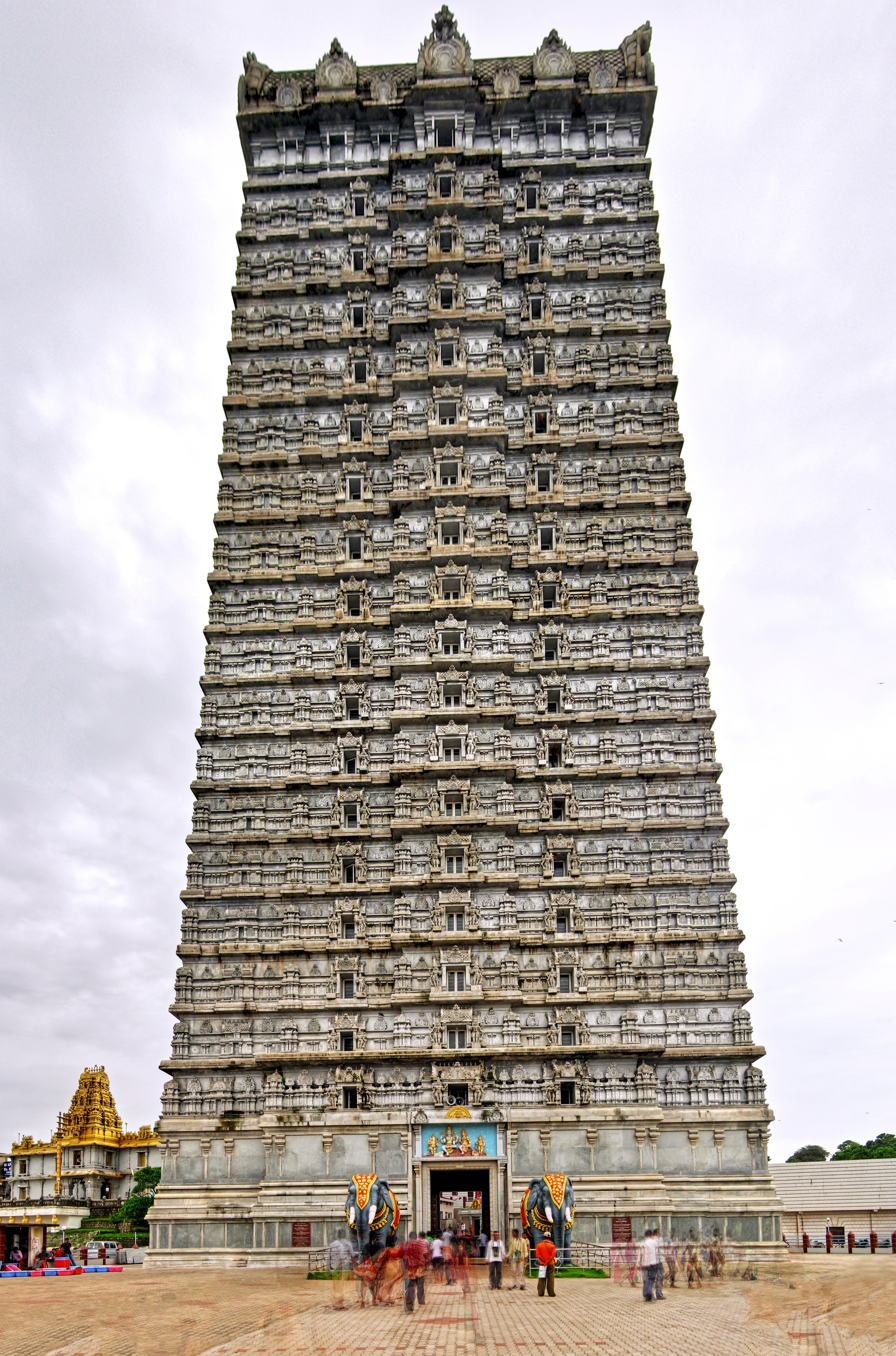
The 20-storied gopura at the Murudeshwara temple. Two life-size elephants in concrete stand guard at the steps leading to it.

Murudeshwara Temple was built on the Kanduka Hill which is surrounded on three sides by the waters of the Laccadive Sea. It is dedicated to Shiva.

A huge towering statue of Shiva, visible from great distances, is present in the temple complex. It is the third tallest statue of Shiva in the world after Statue of Belief and Kailashnath Mahadev Statue. The statue is 123 feet (37 m) in height and took about two years to build. The statue was built by Shivamogga's Kashinath and several other sculptors, financed by businessman and philanthropist R. N. Shetty, at a cost of approximately ₹50 million. The idol is designed such that it gets the sunlight directly and thus appears sparkling. There is also a museum naming Bhukailasa Cave under the statue.

A 20-storied Raja Gopura was constructed at the temple in 2008. It's 249.5 feet tall, which makes it the tallest gopura in the world. The temple authorities have installed a lift that provides a view of the 123-feet Sri Shiva idol from the top of the Raja Gopura.

There is also a Rameshwara linga at the bottom of the hill, where devotees can do seva themselves. A Shaneswar temple has been built next to the idol of Sri Akshayaguna. Two life-size elephants in concrete stand guard at the steps leading to it. The entire temple and temple complex, including the Raja Gopura, is one of the tallest.There is dress code for entry to Murudeshvara temple.

There are statues of Sun Chariot on the side of a park, a pool, statues depicting Arjuna receiving Geetopadesham from Krishna, Ravana being deceived by Ganesha in disguise, Shiva's manifestation as Bhagiratha, descending Ganga, carved around the hill.

The temple is entirely modernised with the exception of the sanctum sanctorum which is still dark and retains its composure. The main deity is Sri Mridesa Linga, also called Murudeshwara. The linga is believed to be a piece of the original Atma Linga and is about two feet below ground level. The devotees performing special sevas like Abhisheka, Rudrabhisheka, Rathotsava, etc., can view the deity by standing before the threshold of the sanctum, and the Linga is illuminated by oil lamps held close by the priests. The Linga is essentially a rough rock inside a hollowed spot in the ground. Entry into the sanctum is banned for all devotees.

== Transportation ==
Murudeshwar lies in Uttara Kannada (U.K.) district of Karnataka (Karunadu) state of India (Bharat). It is connected by road through National Highway 66 (previously numbered as NH-17 ). It is also connected to Indian railway network by Murudeshwar railway station which comes under operational and maintenance jurisdiction of Konkan Railway Corporation Limited (KRCL).

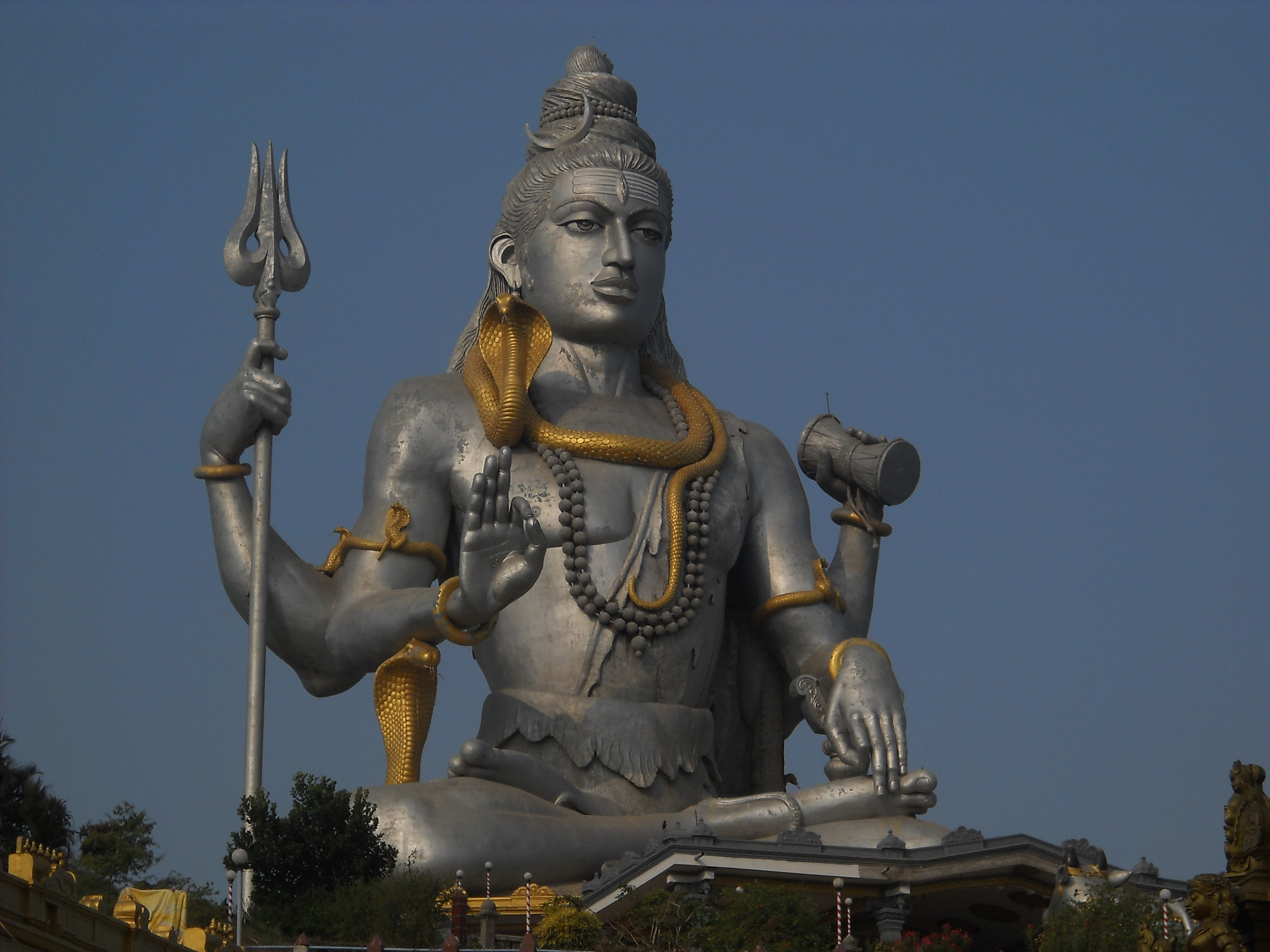
Shiva statue at Murudeswar

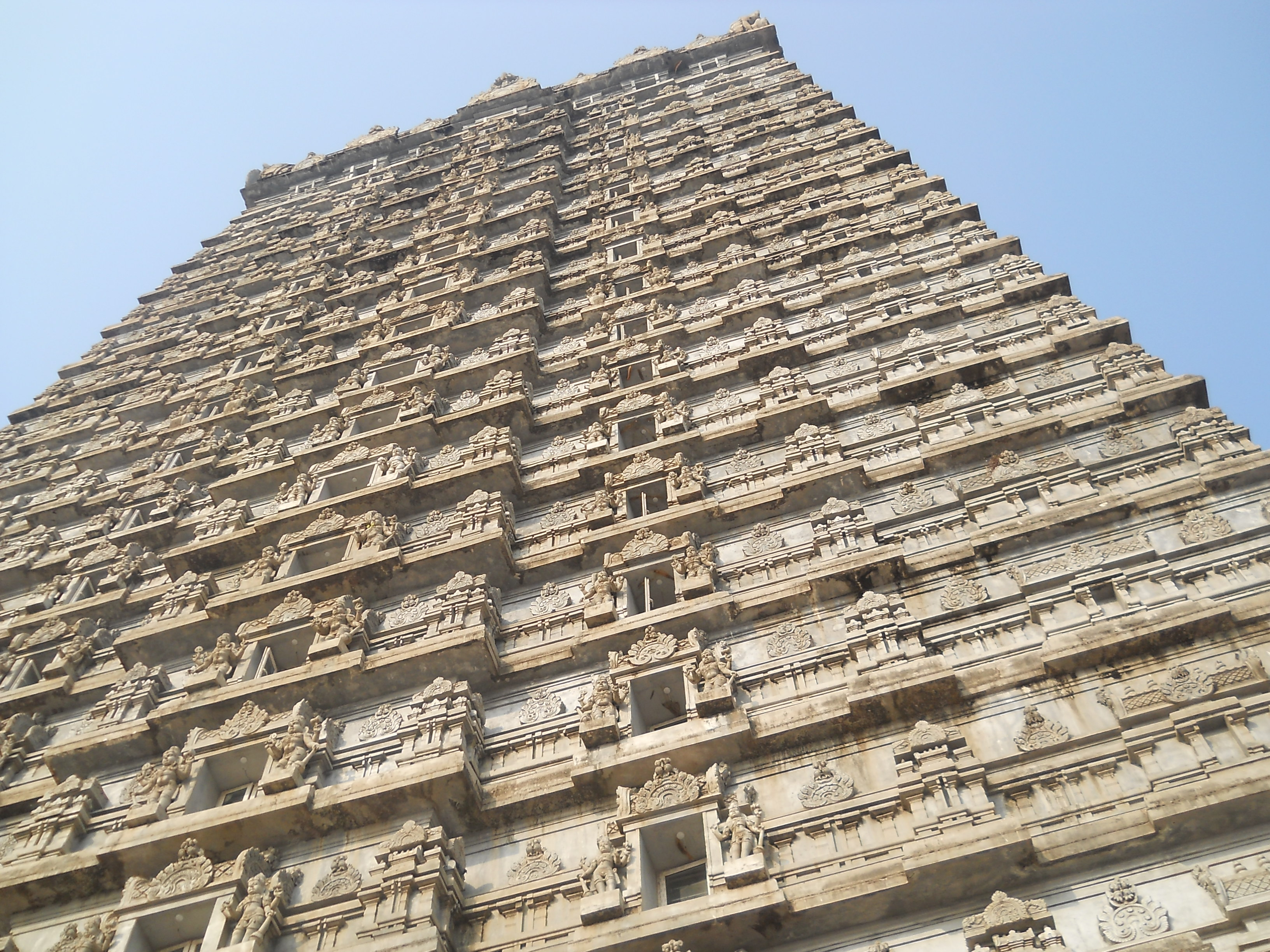
Tower of Murudeswar

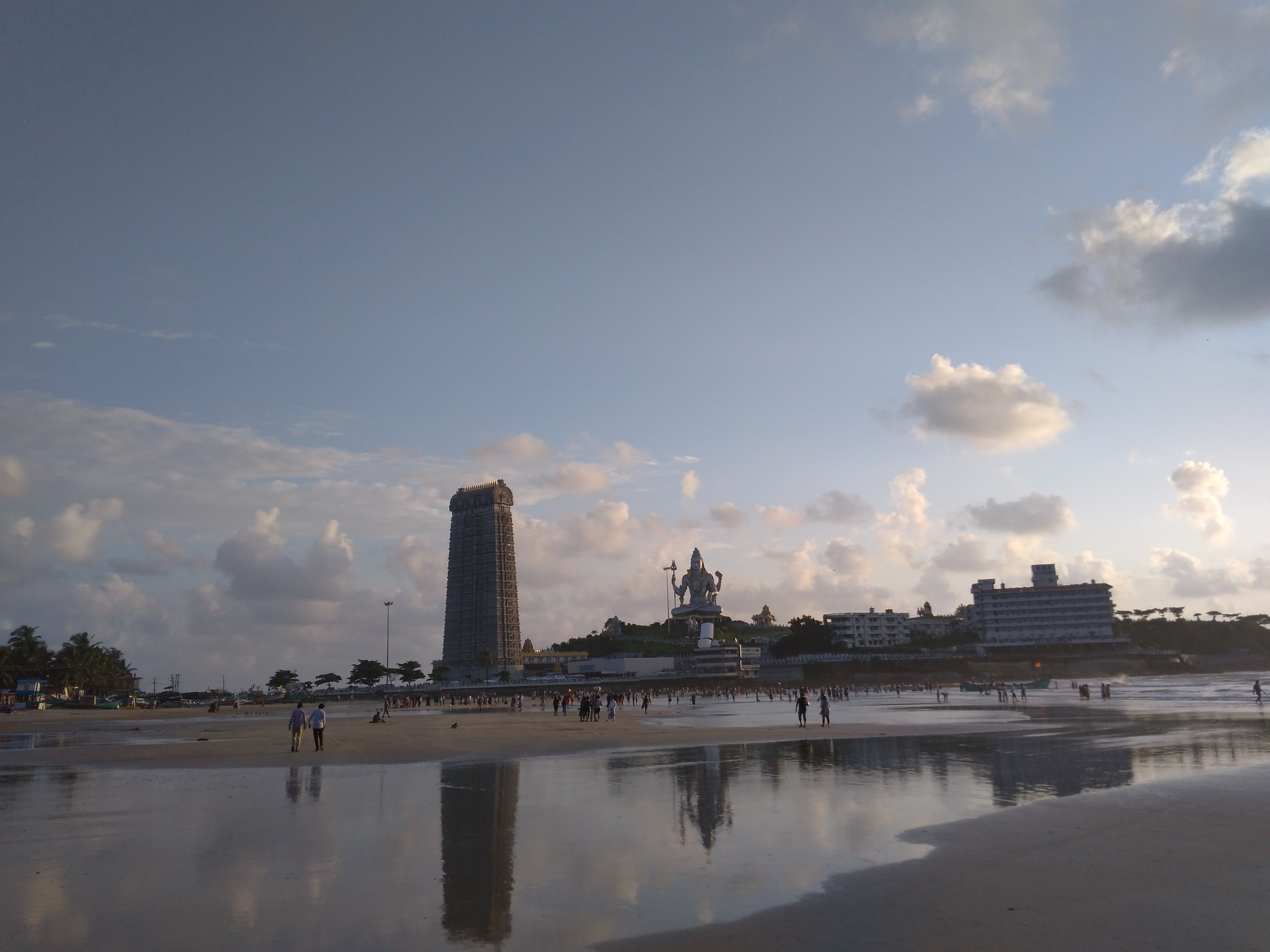
Murudeshwar temple from beach

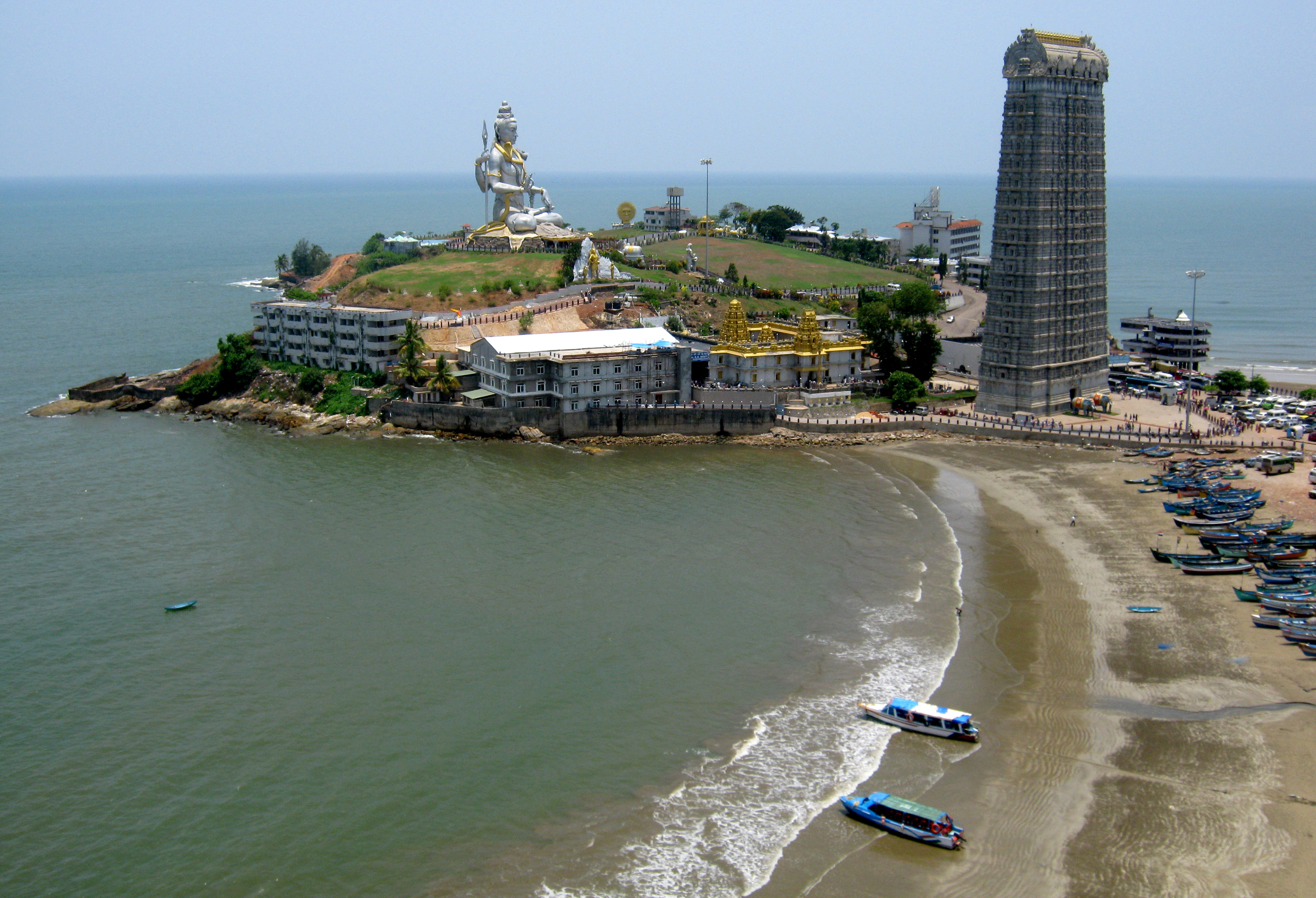
Murudeshwara full view

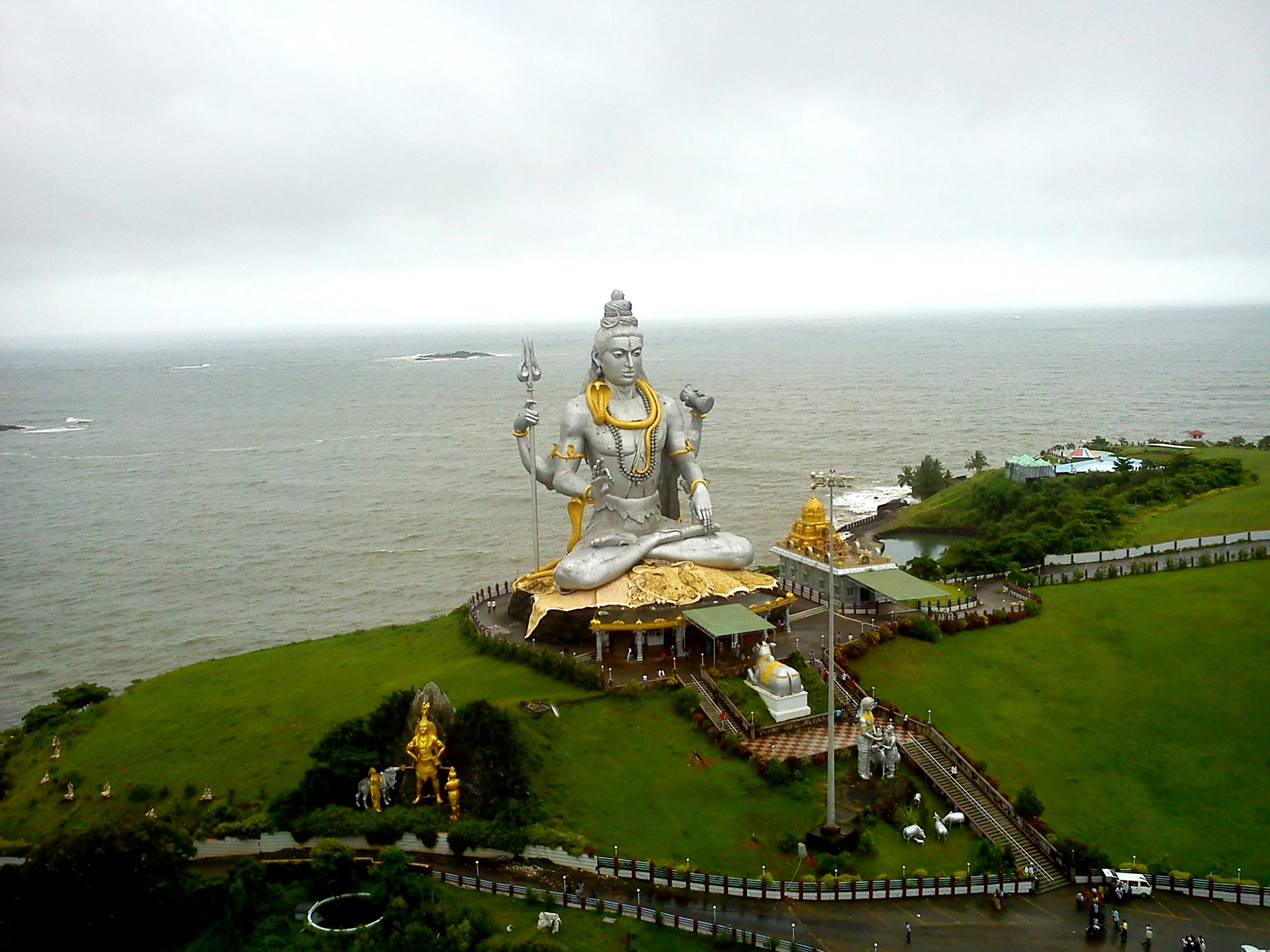
Shiva statue at Murudeshwara

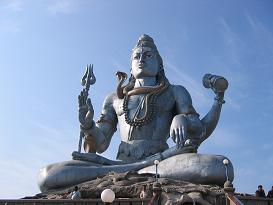
Statue of Shiva

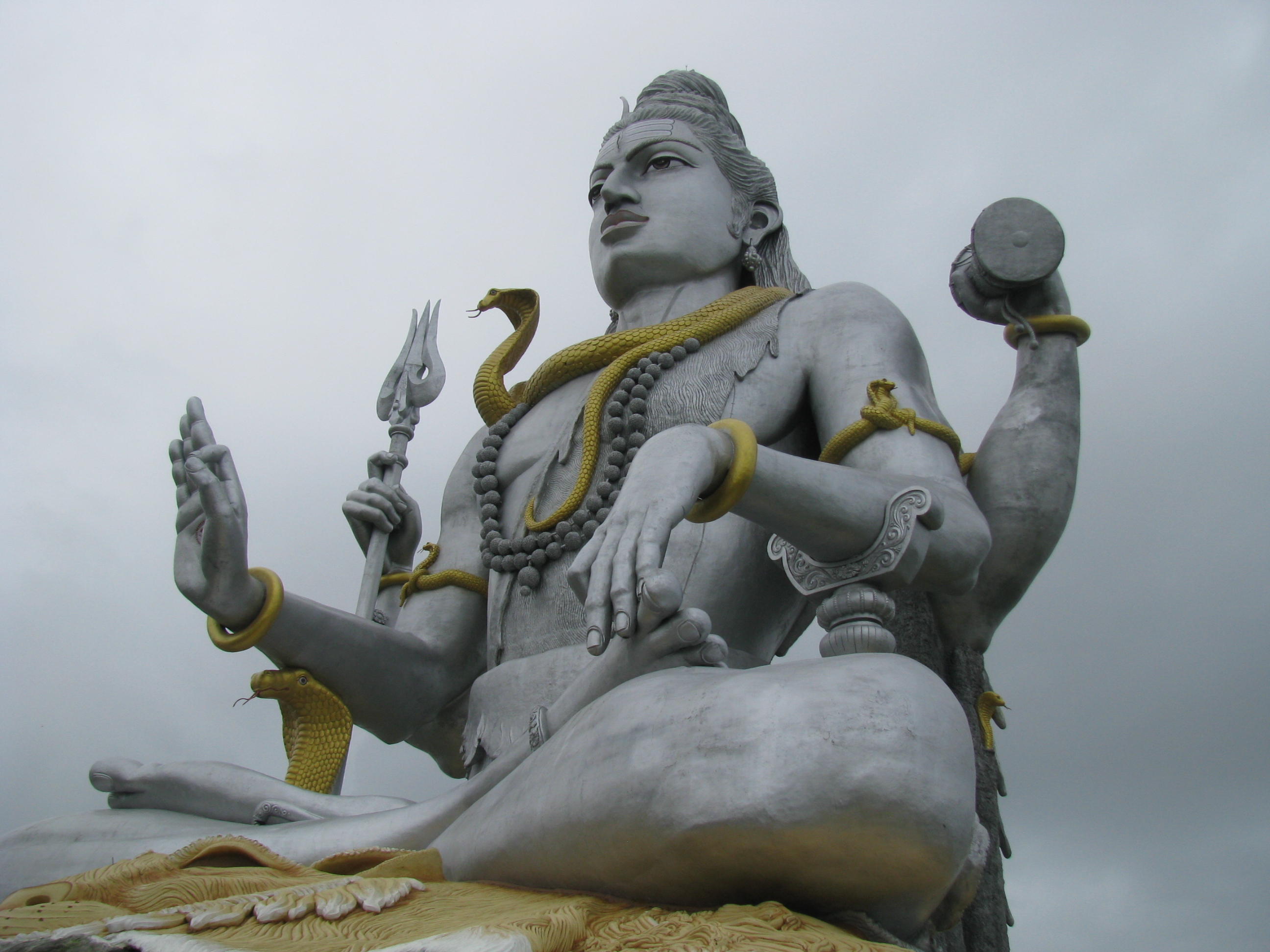
Shiva statue

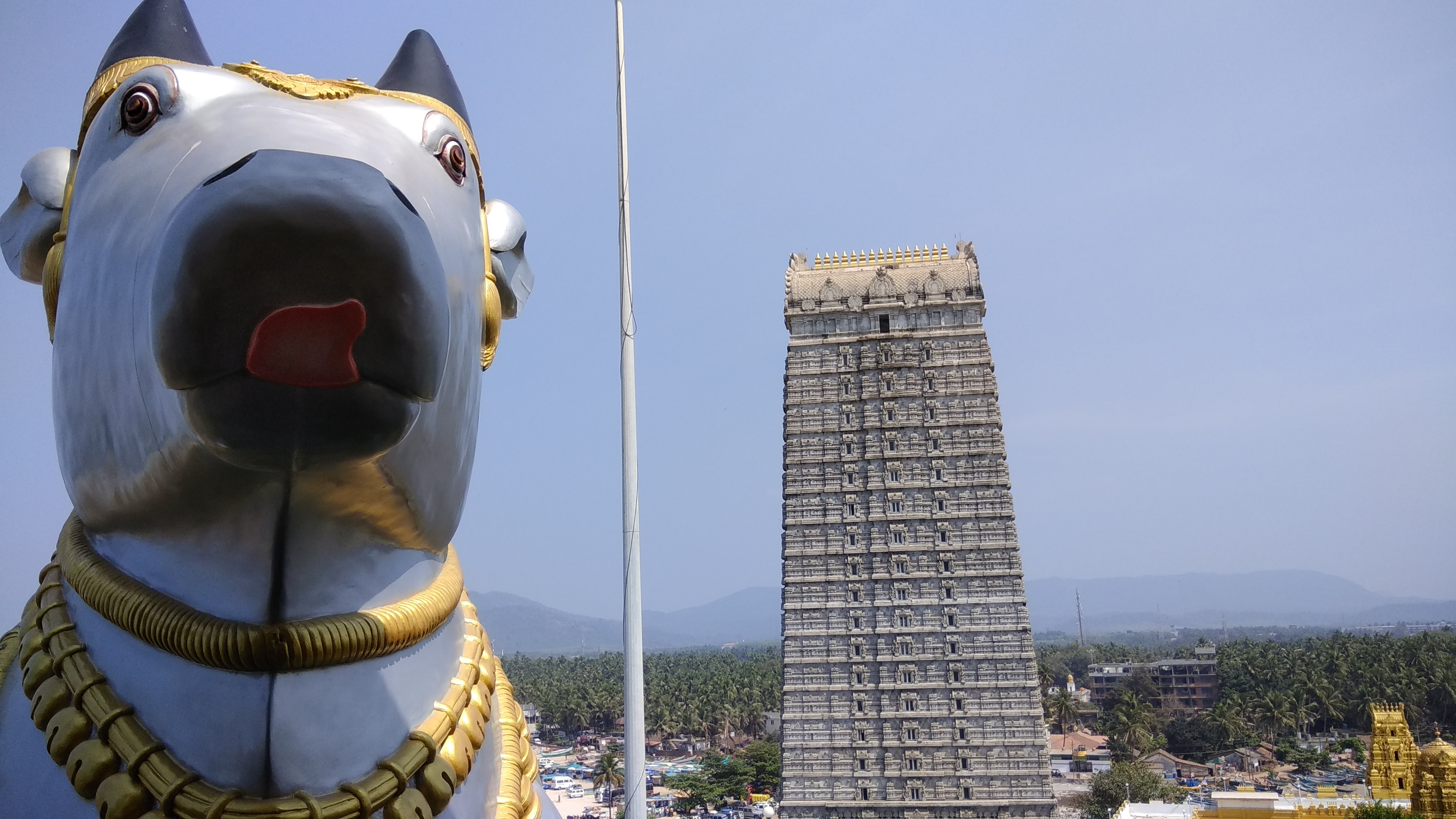
Statue of Nandi at Murudeshwara Temple

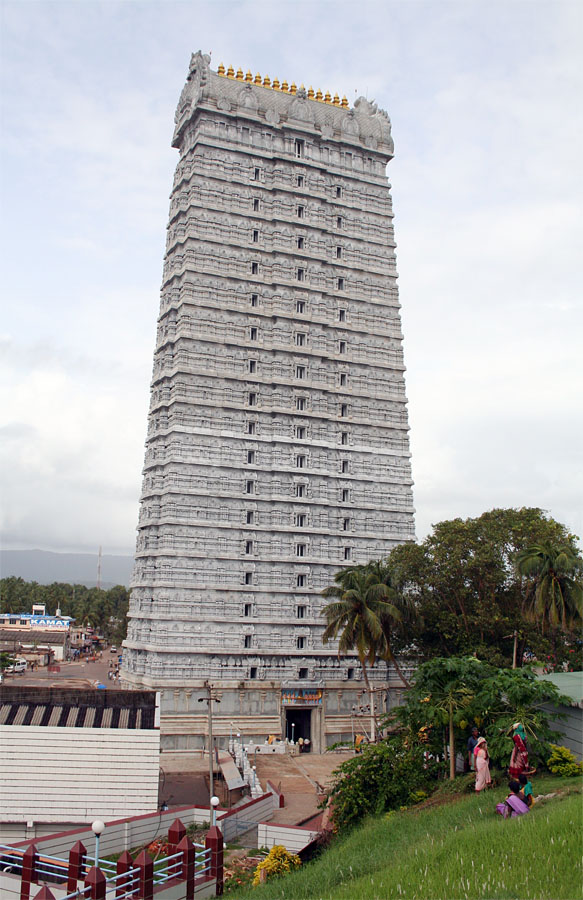
Gopura of Murudeshwara Temple

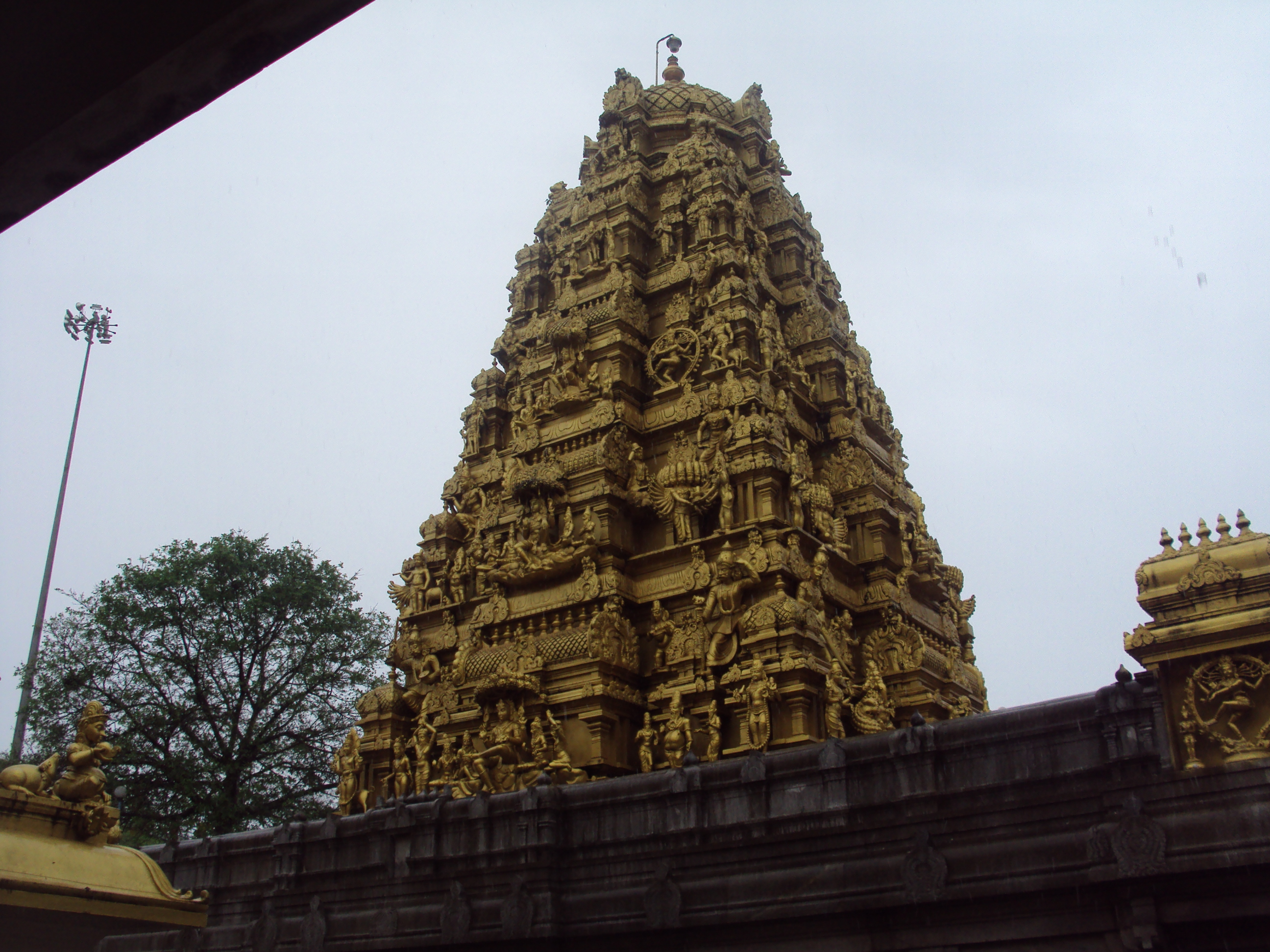
Shikhara of Murudeshwara Temple

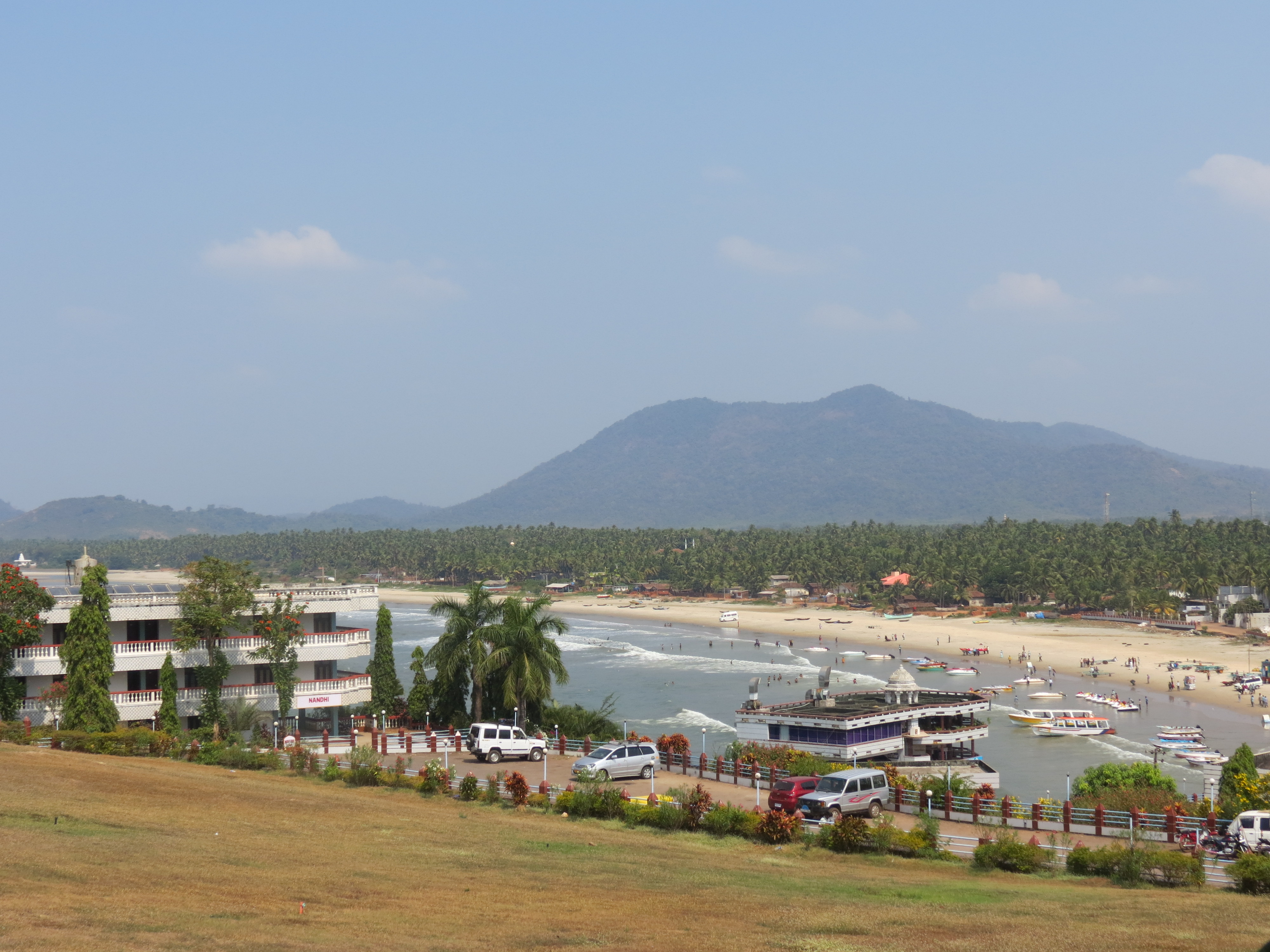
Murudeshwara beach with boats and jet skis
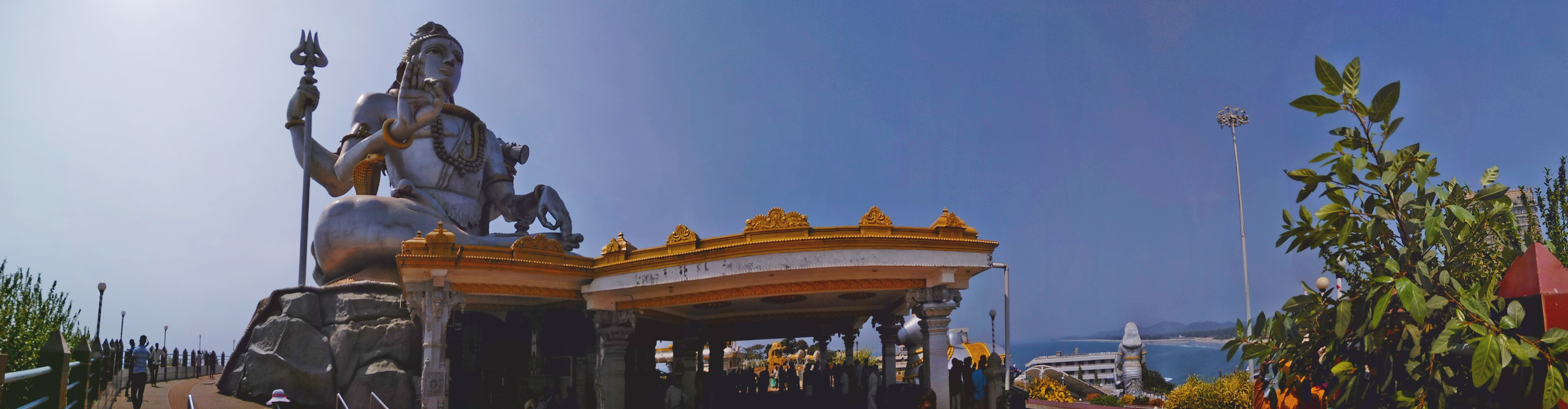
Panoramic view of Murudeshwara Shiva

== See also ==
- Sirsi
- Sirsi Marikamba Temple
- Yana, India
- Chitrapur Math
- Gokarna
- Idagunji
- Maravanthe
