= Gunavante =

Gunawanti
- village
- Country: India
- State: Karnataka

Languages
  - Official: Kannada
- Time zone: UTC+5:30 (IST)

Gunawanti is a small village around 10 kilometers away from Honavar, Uttara Kannada, Karnataka. It is famous for its water tank that people from the world over visit for swimming and bathing.
