= List of Ganesha temples =

Ganesha temples in the world

This is the list of Ganesha temples. In southern India, the temples are also popularly known as Pillaiyar temples or Vinayaka temples, by the alternate popular names of the Hindu god Ganesha in those regions.

== India ==
=== Ashtavinayaka ===
Name	City / town	State	Image
Ballaleshwar Pali	Pali, Karjat, Raigad district	Maharashtra	
Chintamani Temple, Theur	Theur, Pune district	Maharashtra	
Lenyadri	Lenyadri, Pune district	Maharashtra	
Morgaon Ganesha Temple	Morgaon, Pune district	Maharashtra	
Ranjangaon Ganpati	Ranjangaon	Maharashtra	
Siddhivinayak Temple, Siddhatek	Siddhatek, Ahmednagar district	Maharashtra	
Varadvinayak	Mahad, Raigad district	Maharashtra	
Vigneshwara Temple, Ozar	Ozar, Pune district	Maharashtra	

=== Notable ===
Name	City / town	State	Image
Sri Siddi Vinayaka Swamy Temple	Ainavilli	Andhra Pradesh	
Sri Sakshi Ganapathi Swamy Temple	Srisailam	Andhra Pradesh	
Sri Sampath Vinayagar Temple	Visakhapatnam	Andhra Pradesh	
Dodda Ganapathi Temple	Basavanagudi, Bengaluru	Karnataka	
Kurudumale Ganesha Temple	Kurudumale	Karnataka	
Lord Ganesh Temple Boha Pahar	Mayong	Assam	
Ganpatyar Temple	Srinagar	Jammu and Kashmir (union territory)	
Shri Ganesh Mandir	Rafiabad, Baramulla district	Jammu and Kashmir (union territory)	
Trinetra Ganesha Temple	Ranthambhore Fort	Rajasthan	
Bohra Ganesh Temple	Udaipur	Rajasthan	
Shri Vinayaka Temple	Anegudde	Karnataka	
Budha Ganesha Temple	Jajpur	Odisha	
Chintaman Ganesh temple, Ujjain	Ujjain	Madhya Pradesh	
Dagadusheth Halwai Ganapati Temple	Pune	Maharashtra	
Dashabhuja Temple	Pune	Maharashtra	
Ganesha Temple, Idagunji	Idagunji	Karnataka	
Ganpatipule	Ganpatipule, Ratnagiri district	Maharashtra	
Kalamassery Mahaganapathy Temple	Kalamassery	Kerala	
Kanipakam Vinayaka Temple	Kanipakam	Andhra Pradesh	
Karpaka Vinayakar Temple	Pillayarpatti	Tamil Nadu	
Kasba Ganapati	Pune	Maharashtra	
Khajrana Ganesh Temple	Indore	Madhya Pradesh	
Potali wale Ganesh Temple	Indore	Madhya Pradesh	
Kottarakkara Sree Mahaganapathi Kshethram	Kottarakkara	Kerala	
Pournamikavu Temple (Panjamukh - 5-faced Ganesha Temple)	Trivandrum	Kerala	
Kumara Swamy Devasthana, Bangalore	Bangalore	Karnataka	
Madhur Temple	Kasaragod district	Kerala	
Maha Ganapathi Mahammaya Temple	Shirali, Uttara Kannada district	Karnataka	
Mahavinayak Temple	Jajpur district	Odisha	
Nandrudayan Vinayaka Temple	Tiruchirappalli	Tamil Nadu	
Padmalaya	Padmalaya, Jalgaon district	Maharashtra	
Pazhavangadi Ganapathy Temple	Thiruvananthapuram	Kerala	
Ranjangaon Ganpati ^{[Note 1]}	Ranjangaon	Maharashtra	
Siddhivinayak Mahaganapati Temple	Titwala	Maharashtra	
Siddhivinayak Temple	Mumbai	Maharashtra	
Sree Indilayappan Temple	Karickom, Kollam district	Kerala	
Sri Vinayaka Temple, Guddattu	Kundapura, Udupi	Karnataka	
Swetha Vinayagar Temple	Thiruvalanchuzhi	Tamil Nadu	
Tarsod-Ganapati Temple	Tarsod, Jalgaon district	Maharashtra	
Thoondugai vinayagar temple	Thiruchendur	Tamil Nadu	
Ucchi Pillayar Temple, Rockfort	Tiruchirappalli	Tamil Nadu	
Uthrapathiswaraswamy Temple	Tiruchenkattankudi, Tiruvarur district	Tamil Nadu	
Varasiddhi Vinayaka Temple	Chennai	Tamil Nadu	
Swayambhu Sri Abhista Gnana Ganapathi Temple	Kurnool	Andhra Pradesh	
Jai Vinayak temple	Kachare Village, Ratnagiri dist.	Maharashtra	
Shree Navshya Ganpati Mandir	Nashik, on the banks of godavari river	Maharashtra	
Malliyoor Sree Maha Ganapthi Temple	Kottayam	Kerala	
Velum Sree Maha Ganapthi Temple	Mayyil	Kannur, Kerala	
Batheri Maha Ganapthi Temple	Sulthan Batheri	Kerala	
Kakkad Maha Ganapthi Temple	Trichur	Kerala	

== Outside India ==
Name	City / town	Country	Image
Suryavinayak Temple Temple	Kathmandu	Nepal	
Arulmigu Navasakti Vinayagar Temple	Victoria	Seychelles	
Hindu Temple Society of North America	Flushing, Queens	United States of America	
Sri Ganesha Temple	Nashville, TN	United States	
Siddhi Vinayak Temple	Rahim Yar Khan, Punjab	Pakistan	
Ganesha Temple	Rawalpindi	Pakistan	
Sri Ganesha Hindu Temple of Utah	South Jordan, Utah	United States	
Sri Ganesha Hindu Temple	Berlin	Germany	
Shri Sitthi Vinayagar Temple	Medan	Indonesia	
Anbu Vinayagar Temple	Christchurch	New Zealand	
Sri Sithi Vinayagar Temple	Petaling Jaya	Malaysia	
Sri Varatharajah Selvavinayagar Temple	Den Helder	Netherlands	
Ganesh Temple inside Devasathan	Rattanakosin Island, Bangkok	Thailand	
Ganesh Temple, Huai Khwang	Din Daeng, Bangkok	Thailand	
Ganesh Temple, Bang Yai	Bang Yai, Nonthaburi	Thailand	
Pikanesuandevalai	Mueang Chiang Mai, Chiang Mai	Thailand	
