= Palle (surname) =

Palle is a surname. Notable people with the surname include:

- Albert Palle (1916 - 2007), French writer
- Mogens Palle (1934 – 2022), Danish professional boxing promoter and manager
- Sébastien Palle (born 1961), French writer

== See also ==
- Palle (given name)
- Palle (disambiguation)
