= Pali (disambiguation) =

Pali is a Middle Indo-Aryan language.

Pali may also refer to:

== Places ==
=== India ===
- Pali, Rajasthan
  - Pali district
  - Pali Lok Sabha constituency
  - Pali Assembly constituency
- Pali, Darbhanga, a village in Bihar
- Pali, Faridabad, a village in Haryana
- Pali, Hardoi, a town in Uttar Pradesh
- Pali, Jaunpur, a village in Uttar Pradesh
- Pali, Korba district, a town in Chhattisgarh
- Pali, Karjat, a village in Raigad district, Maharashtra
- Pali, Lalitpur, a town in Uttar Pradesh
- Pali, Raebareli, a village in Uttar Pradesh
- Pali, Raigad, a town in Maharashtra
- Pali, Rewari, a village in Haryana
- Pali, Umaria, a town in Madhya Pradesh
- Pali Village, an urban village in Bandra suburb of Mumbai
- Ali Nagar Pali, or Pali, a village in Bihar

=== Elsewhere ===
- Páli, Hungary
- Penukal Abab Lematang Ilir Regency, Indonesia
- Pali, Montenegro
- Pali, Nepal
- The pali, a portion of Hawaii Route 30 on Maui, Hawaii

== Other uses ==
- Pali language (Chadic), a West Chadic language of Nigeria
- Pali Wine Co., a winery in Santa Barbara, California, US
- Pali, a 1989 Hindi short story collection by Bhisham Sahni
- Dr Charles Pali, alias of fictional character Green Lama
- Zoltan Pali (born 1960), American architect
- Palisades Charter High School, or Pali, in Los Angeles, US
- Neoliberal Party (Partido Neo-Liberal, PALI), a Nicaraguan political party
- Hurricane Pali, a 2016 Pacific storm

== See also ==
- Palli (disambiguation)
- Pali Canon, a collection of early canonical Buddhist scriptures
- Pali Dome, a volcano in British Columbia, Canada
- Hawaii Route 61, often called the Pali Highway
