= Palli =

Palli or Pally may refer to:

== People ==
- Angeliki Palli (1798–1875), Greek-Italian writer, translator and early feminist
- Anne Marie Palli (born 1955), French golfer
- Fani Palli-Petralia (born 1943), Greek lawyer and politician
- Hero Palli (1925–2000), Greek soprano
- Niki Palli (born 1987), Israeli athlete

== Places ==
- Pälli, village in Lääne-Nigula Parish, Lääne County, Estonia
- Palli, Hiiu County, village in Hiiumaa Parish, Hiiu County, Estonia
- Palli, Võru County, village in Haanja Parish, Võru County, Estonia

== Other uses ==
- Palle, Palli or Pally, means village in Telugu
- Palli, native word for a non-Hindu shrine in south India
- Palli is a Tamil caste claiming to be former Kshatriyas of the Chola period.
- Palli (പള്ളി) means Church in Malayalam and uses St. Thomas Christian or Syrian Christian in Keralam

== See also ==
- Pali (disambiguation), a Middle Indo-Aryan language native to the Indian subcontinent
- Pallis, a Greek surname
- Palle (disambiguation)
