= Sri Vinayaka Temple, Guddattu =

Hindu Temple

Guddattu Sri Vinayaka Temple
- Jaladhivasa Sri Ganapathi (Vinayaka) Temple
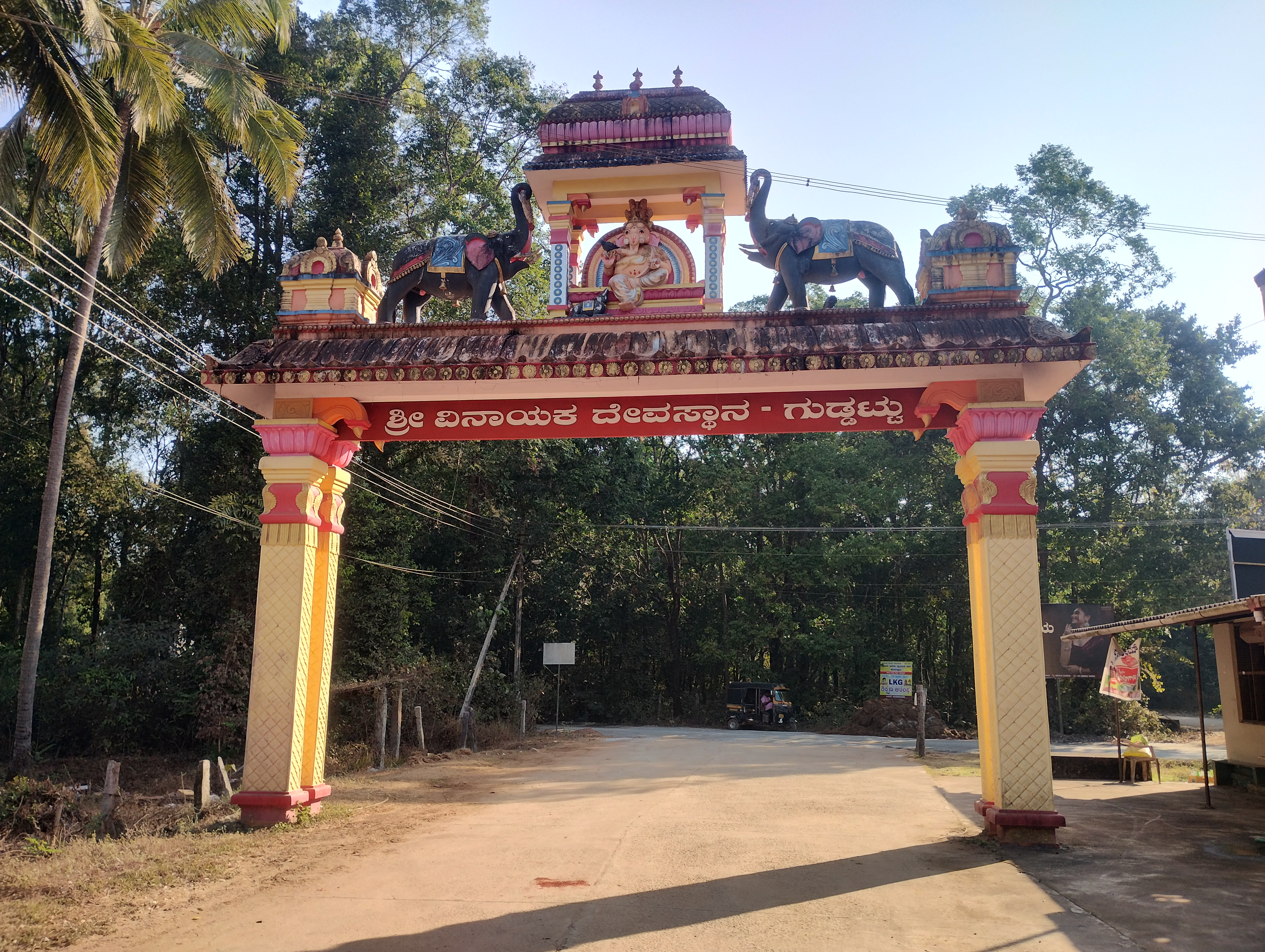
- Arch at the entrance of the temple, in 2026

- Location in Karnataka

Religion
- Affiliation: Hinduism
- District: Udupi
- Deity: Ganapathy
- Festival: Ganesh Chaturthi

Location
- Location: Kundapura
- State: Karnataka
- Country: India
- Interactive map of Guddattu Sri Vinayaka Temple
- Coordinates: 13°37′42″N 74°41′20″E

Architecture
- Established: 13th century
- Temple: 1

Website
- Official website

Guddattu Sri Vinayaka Temple is located at Kundapura, Udupi District in the state of Karnataka, India. It is a Hindu temple dedicated to god Ganapathy, also called Jaladhivasa GanapathyTemple, It is the only Jaladhivasa Ganapathi temple in India. Lord Ganesha’s three-foot idol is believed to have emerged from the rock. Aayira Koda Seva, Tailabhyanjana, Panchamrutha and Rudrabhisheka are performed in the temple every day.

The temple belongs to Guddattu Adiga family ancestry.

== Media gallery ==
Premises of the temple in 2026
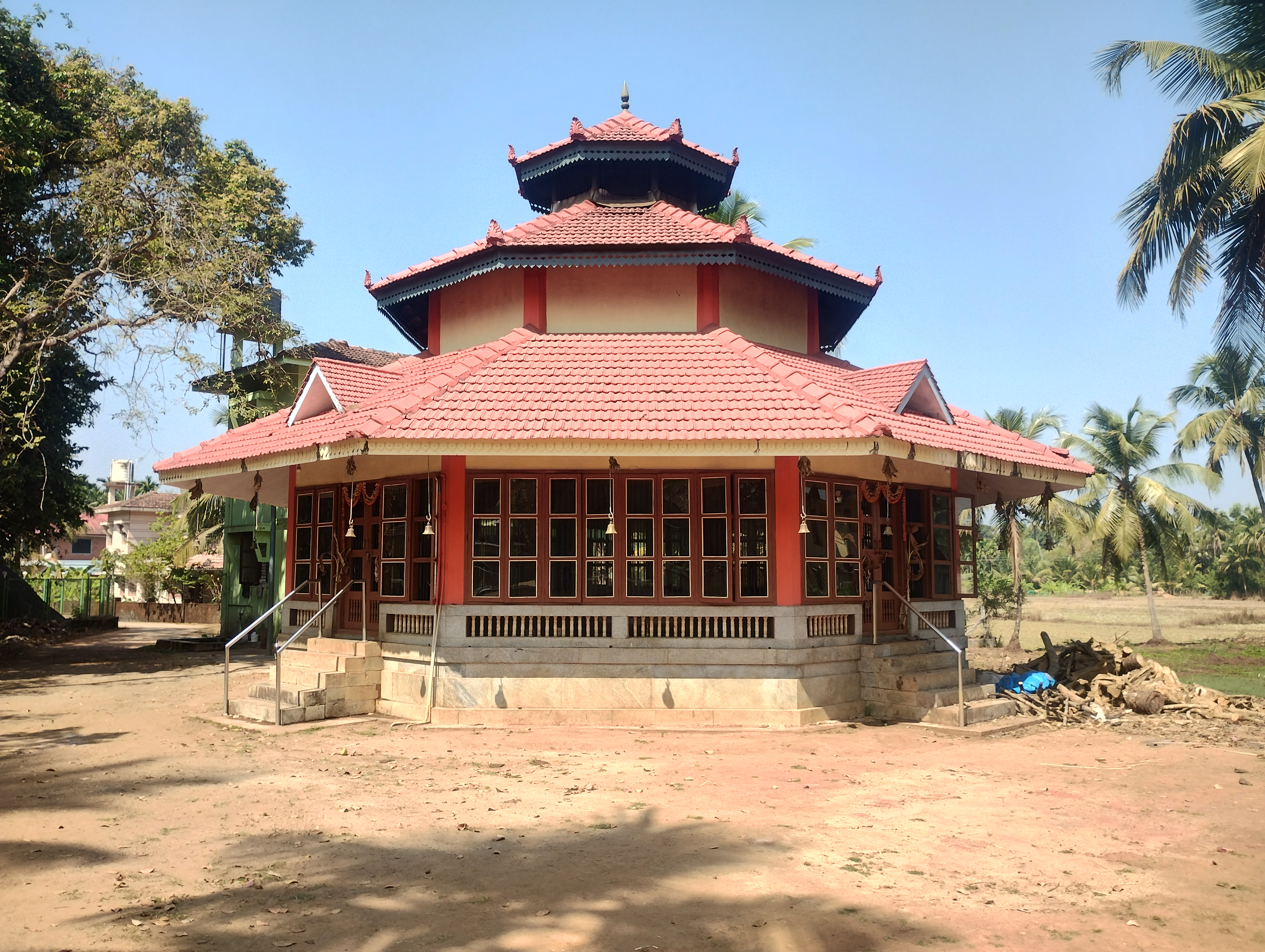

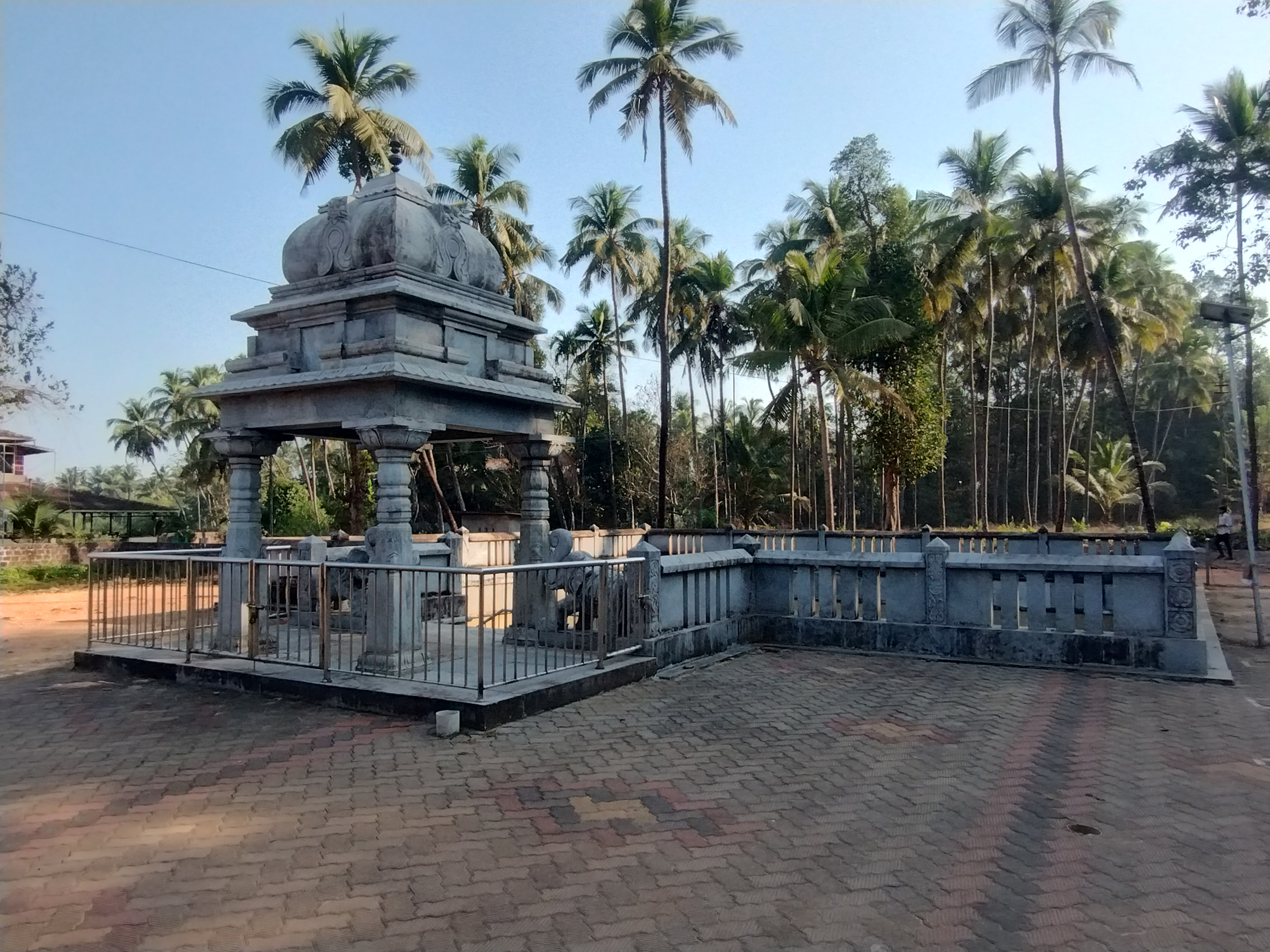

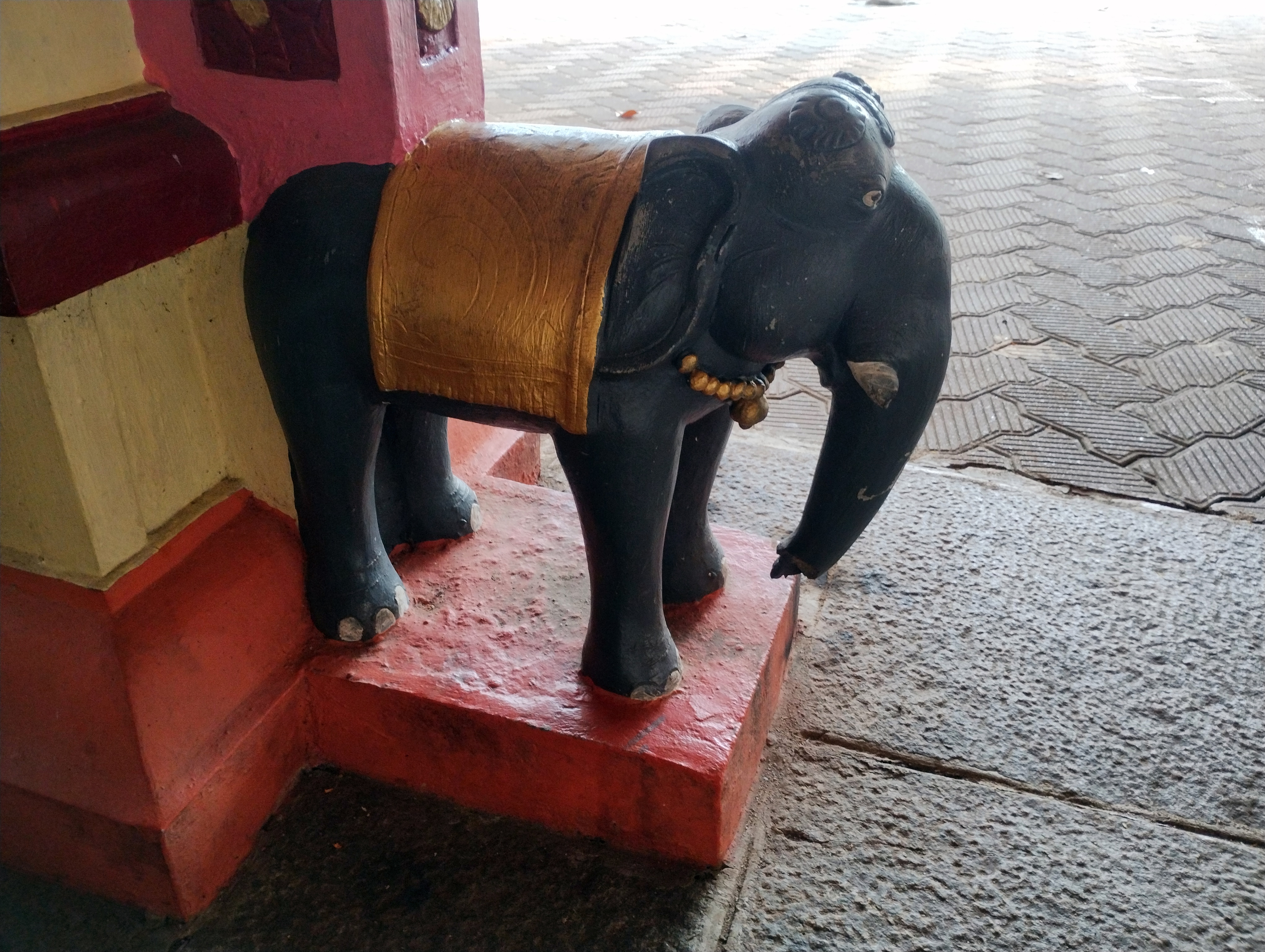

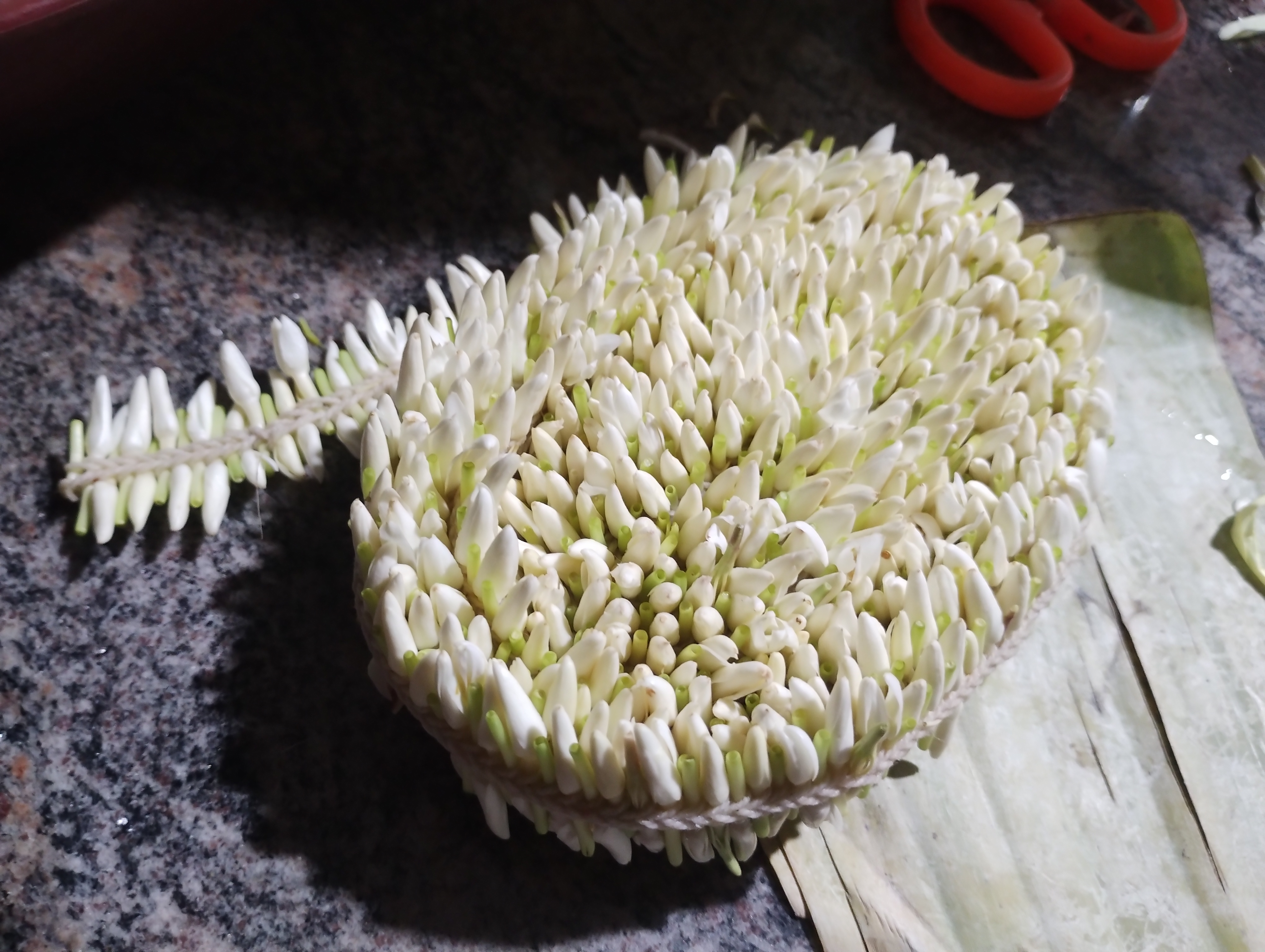

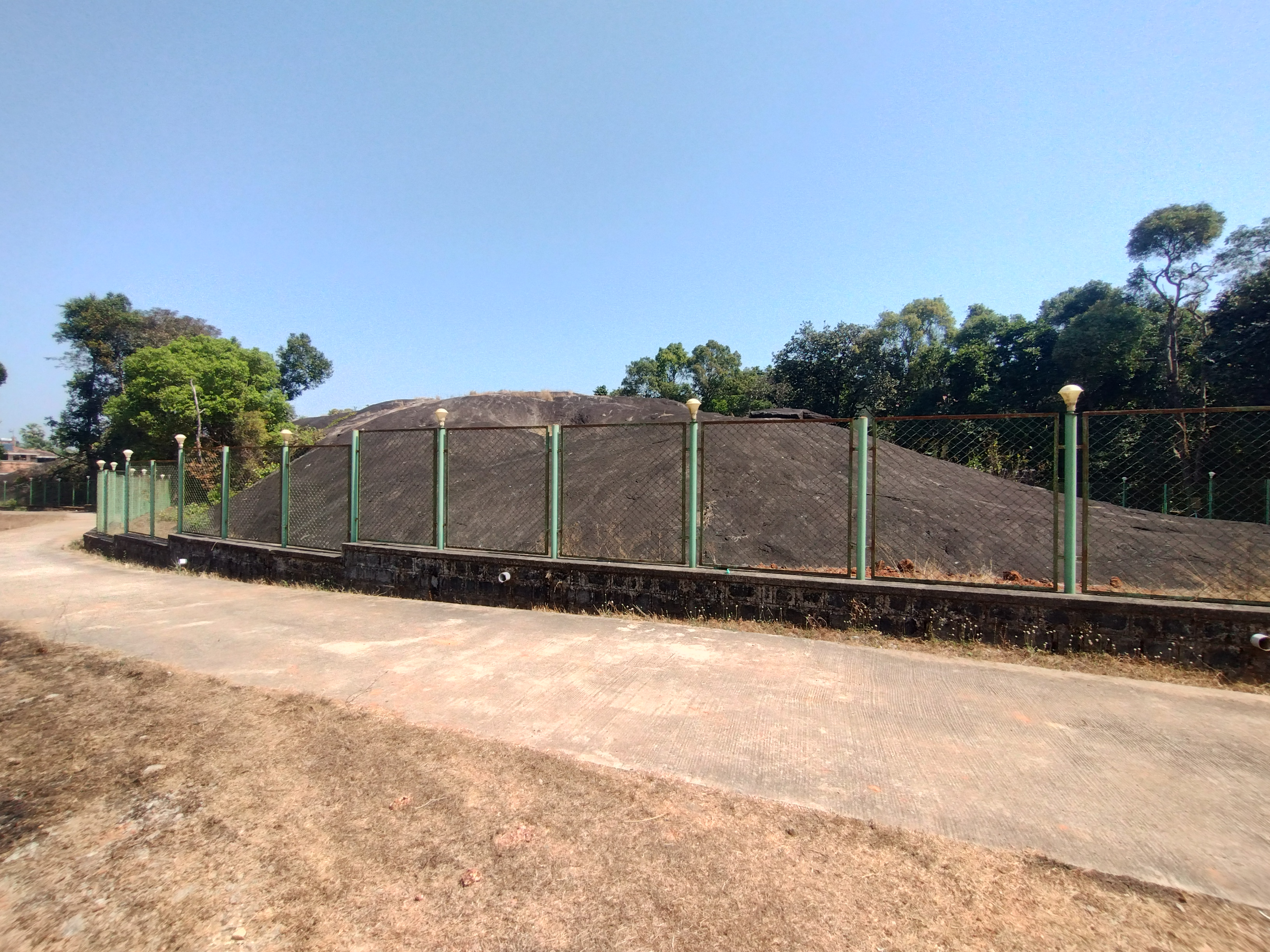

== See also ==
- Ganesha Temple, Idagunji
- Ganesha Temple, Morgaon
- List of Ganesha temples
