= Palle =

Palle may refer to

- Palle (given name)
- Palle (surname)

== See also ==
- Palli (disambiguation)
