= Sébastien Palle =

French writer

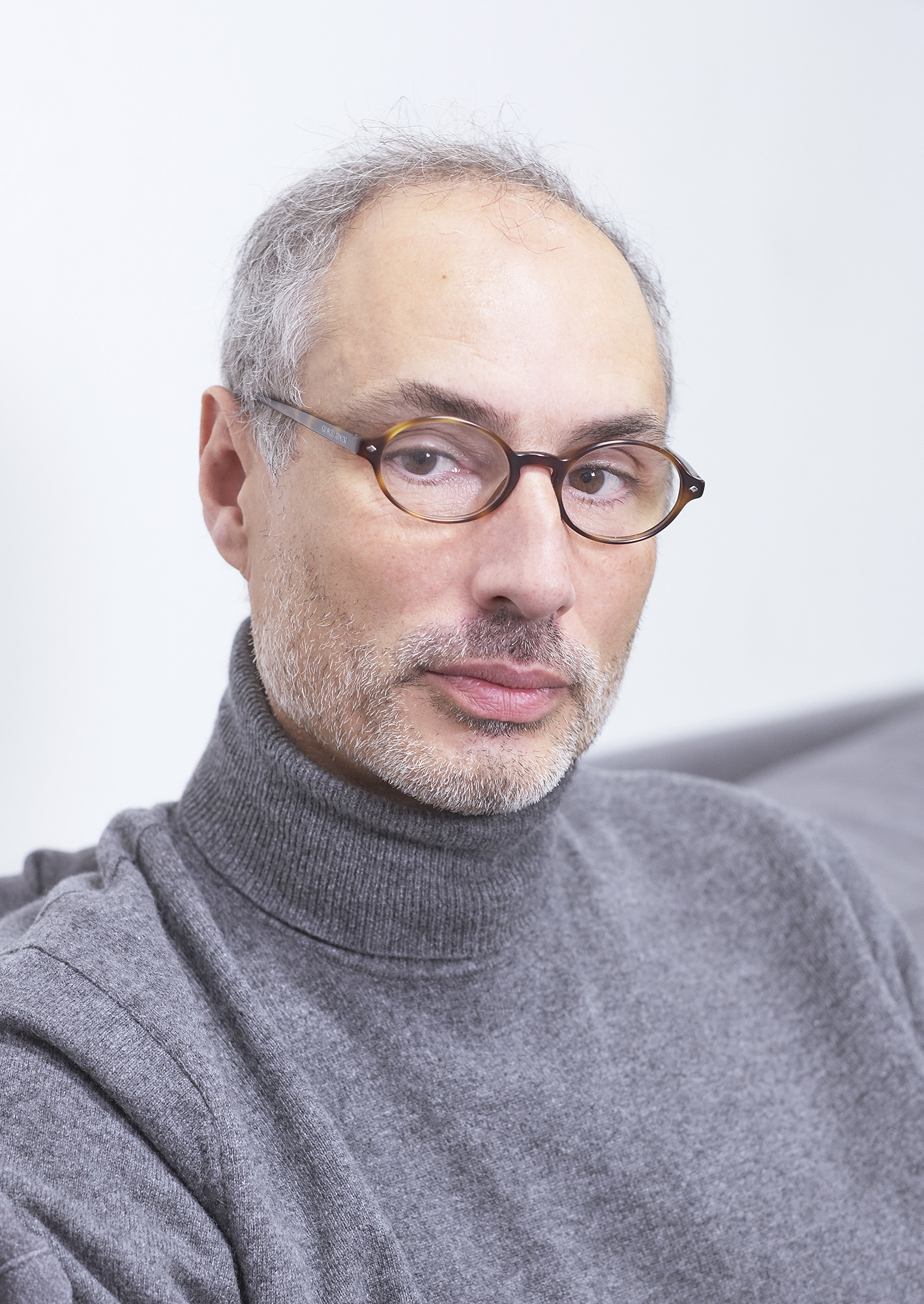
Sébastien Palle in 2018

Sébastien Palle (born 1961) is a French writer. He obtained a master's degree in Public Affairs from the Paris Institute of Political Studies. He also has a Master's in Science Technology and Society from the Pantheon-Sorbonne University of Economics and a degree in history from Sorbonne University. He has worked in the space industry and in finance. His debut novel L'Etoffe du destin appeared in 2019. He is the son of the writer and journalist Albert Palle.
