= Pallis =

Pallis (Greek: Πάλλης) is a Greek surname and may refer to:

- Alexandros Pallis (1851–1935), Greek educational and language reformer who translated the New Testament into Modern Greek
- Chris Pallis (1923–2005), Anglo-Greek neurologist and socialist intellectual
- Jani Macari Pallis, American academic, engineer, and executive
- Konstantinos Pallis (1871–1941), Greek Army staff officer, who served as chief of staff of the Army of Asia Minor
- Marco Pallis (1895–1989), Greek-British author and mountaineer
- Marietta Pallis (1882–1963), Greek-Briton ecologist and botanical artist

== See also ==
- Palli (disambiguation)
