= Shrimati Lakshmibai Dagdusheth Halwai Datta Temple, Pune =

Hindu temple in Maharashtra, India

Coordinates: 18°30′53″N 73°51′24″E

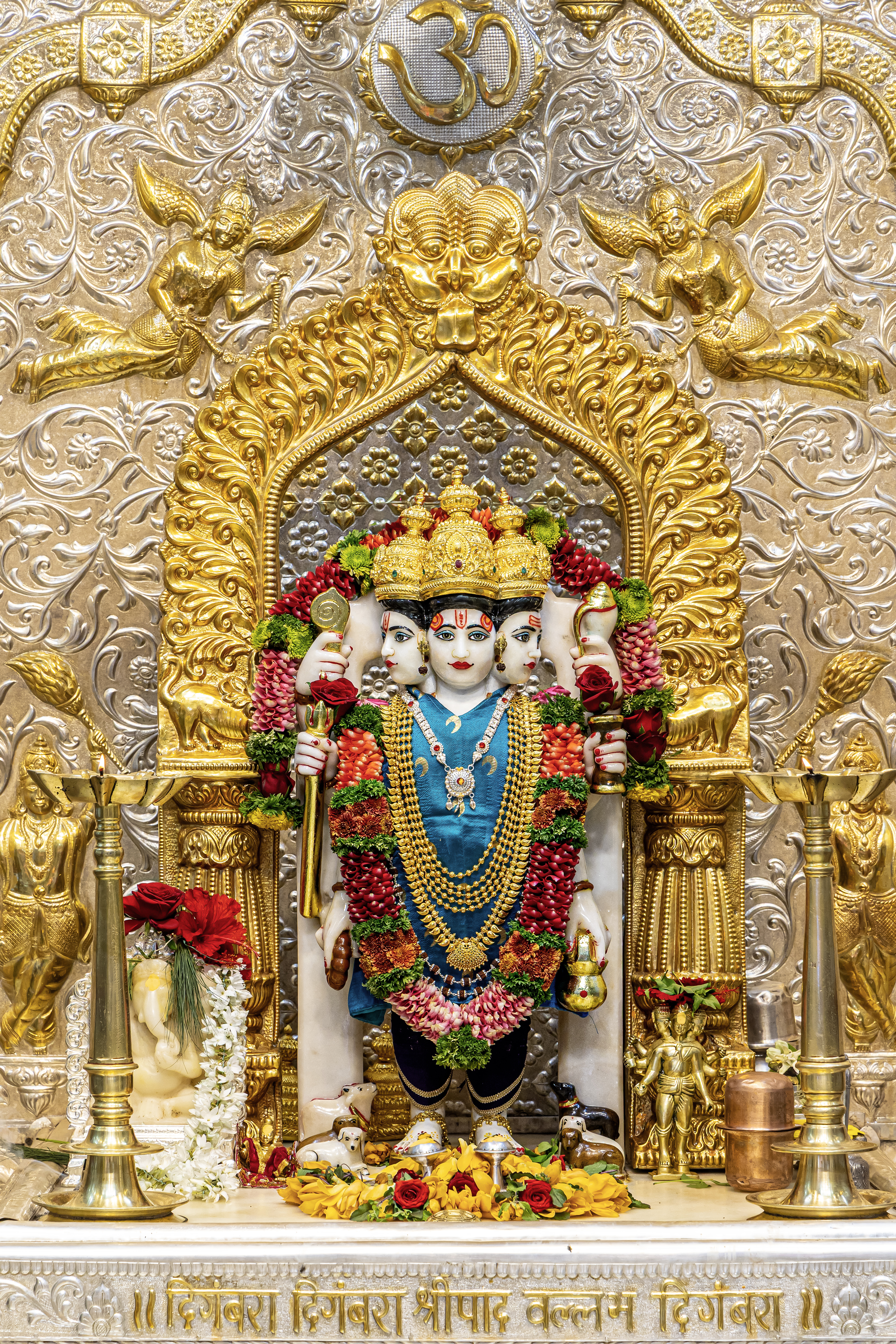

Religion
- Affiliation: Hinduism
- District: Pune district
- Governing body: Shrimati Lakshmibai Dagdusheth Halwai Datta Mandir Trust

Location
- Location: Pune City
- State: Maharashtra
- Country: India

The Shrimati Lakshmibai Dagdusheth Halwai Datta Temple, Pune is a Hindu temple dedicated to the Hindu god Dattatreya in the city of Pune, India.

== History ==
The Laxmibai Dagdusheth Halwai Datta Temple was established by Laxmibai Dagdusheth, in the late 19th century, around 1898, under the guidance of Shri Madhavnath Maharaj. Laxmibai Dagdusheth was the wife of Dagdusheth Gadve, a Lingayat merchant originally from Karnataka. After settling in Pune, he started a confectionery business, which led the family to become popularly known as "Dagdusheth Halwai".

The temple is located in Budhwar Peth, Pune, a short distance from the Dagdusheth Halwai Ganpati Temple. Both temples were established by Laxmibai and Dagdusheth.
