= Palle (given name) =

Palle is a given name. Notable people with the given name include:

- Palle Christiansen (born 1973), Greenlandic politician
- Palle Huld (1912 – 2010), Danish Boy Scout film actor and writer
- Palle Mikkelborg (born 1941), Danish jazz trumpet player, composer, arranger and record producer
- Palle Sørensen (1927 – 2018), Danish convicted murderer
- Palle Suenson, (1904 - 1987), Danish modernist architect
- Palle Ydstebø, (born 1961, Norwegian military strategist

== See also ==
- Palle (disambiguation)
