= Tarsod-Ganapati Temple =

Hindu Temple

Tarsod Ganapati Temple is a Hindu temple dedicated to Ganesha in the village of Tarsod in Jalgaon district, Maharashtra, India. The temple is 8 km away from Jalgaon.

The temple is mentioned in various scripts written about Sai Baba of Shirdi and Gajanan Maharaj. During the Maratha Empire, the region was under the jagir ruled by Nimbalkar family.
