= Thoondugai Vinayagar Temple =

Hindu Temple

Thoondugai vinayagar temple is a Hindu temple dedicated to Lord Ganesha, located in Thiruchendur Murugan Temple complex in the State of Tamil Nadu, India.

== Legend ==
According to legend, the temple sages did not have much money while Thiruchendur Murugan Temple was being constructed. So the sages gave the construction workers sacred ash packed in paneer leaves instead. After praying to Ganesha at the end of the workday, the workers would open the leaves package and discover that the sacred ash had turned into gold coins, proportionate to their work that day.
