= Pali, Jaunpur =

Village in Jaunpur, Uttar Pradesh, India

Pali is a village in Jaunpur, Uttar Pradesh, India.
