= Swayambhu Sri Abhista Gnana Ganapathi Temple =

Hindu temple in Kurnool, India

Swayambhu Sri Abhista Gnana Ganapathi Temple, Kurnool
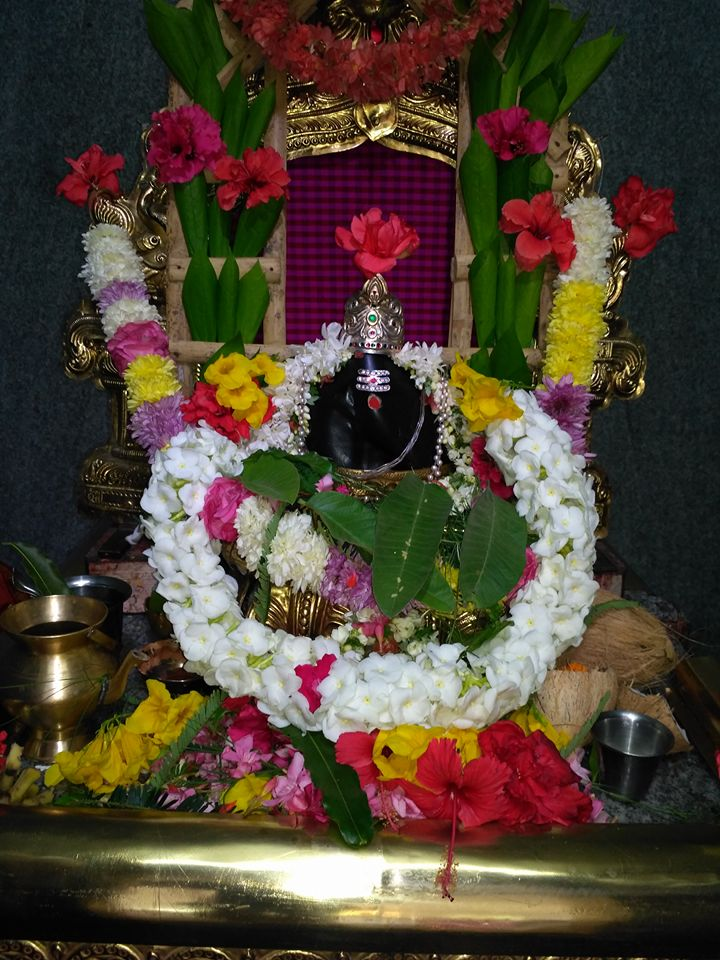

- Location in Andhra Pradesh

Religion
- Affiliation: Hinduism
- District: Kurnool
- Deity: Ganesha
- Festival: Varshika Brahmotsavam
- Governing body: Jampala Abhinai Charitable Trust (JACT)

Location
- Location: Kurnool
- State: Andhra Pradesh
- Country: India
- Interactive map of Swayambhu Sri Abhista Gnana Ganapathi Temple, Kurnool
- Coordinates: 15°45′39.3876″N 78°0′49.4634″E

Architecture
- Type: South Indian architecture

The Swayambhu Sri Abhista Gnana Ganapathi Temple (SSAGG Temple) is a Ganapathi temple located in Mayuri Greenland, Kurnool district, Andhra Pradesh, India.

== History ==
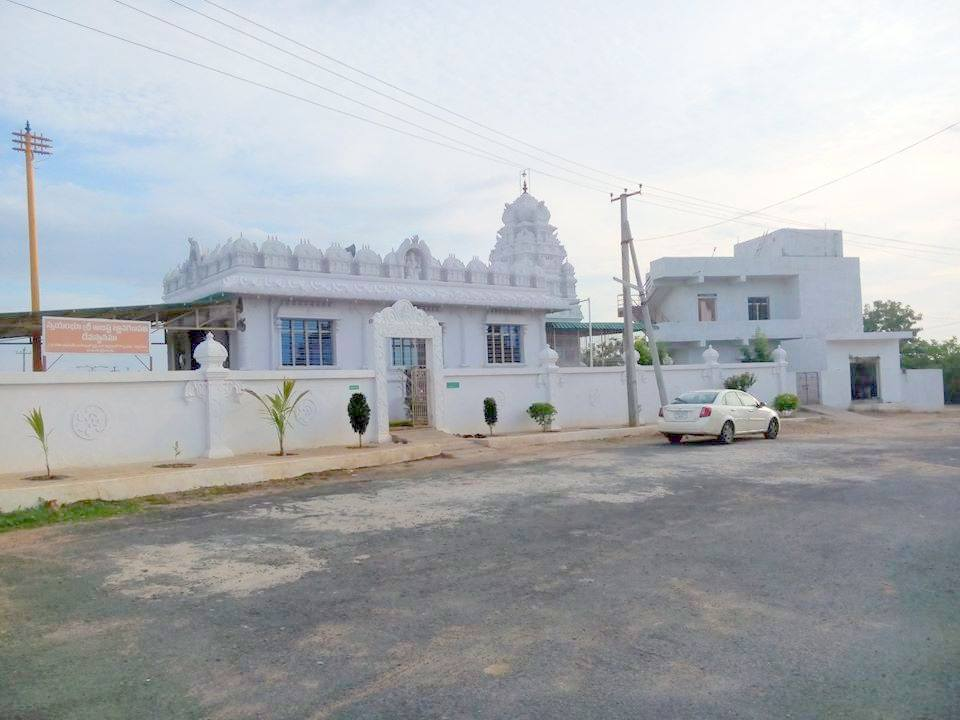
SSAGG Temple

The temple was constructed by the Jampala Family under the management of the Jampala Abhinay Charitable Trust (JACT). The trust was founded by J. Lakshmi Kanthi and J. Madhusudhan Rao, who are also the temple's trustees.

The Vigraha Prathishta (idol installation ceremony) was performed from 22 to 24 August 2013. Since then, the temple has conducted an annual Varshika Brahmotsavam on 18 October. Devotees believe their prayers to the deity are often fulfilled.

Every month, the temple conducts the Lakshmi Ganapathi Homam on the eve of Sankashta Hara Chathurthi.

== Gallery ==
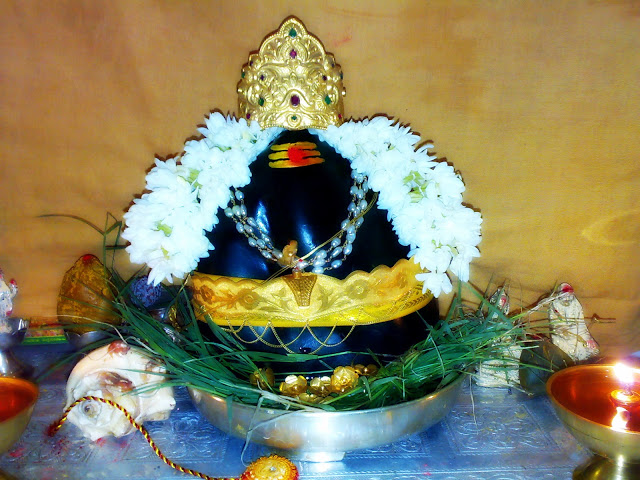
Main Deity

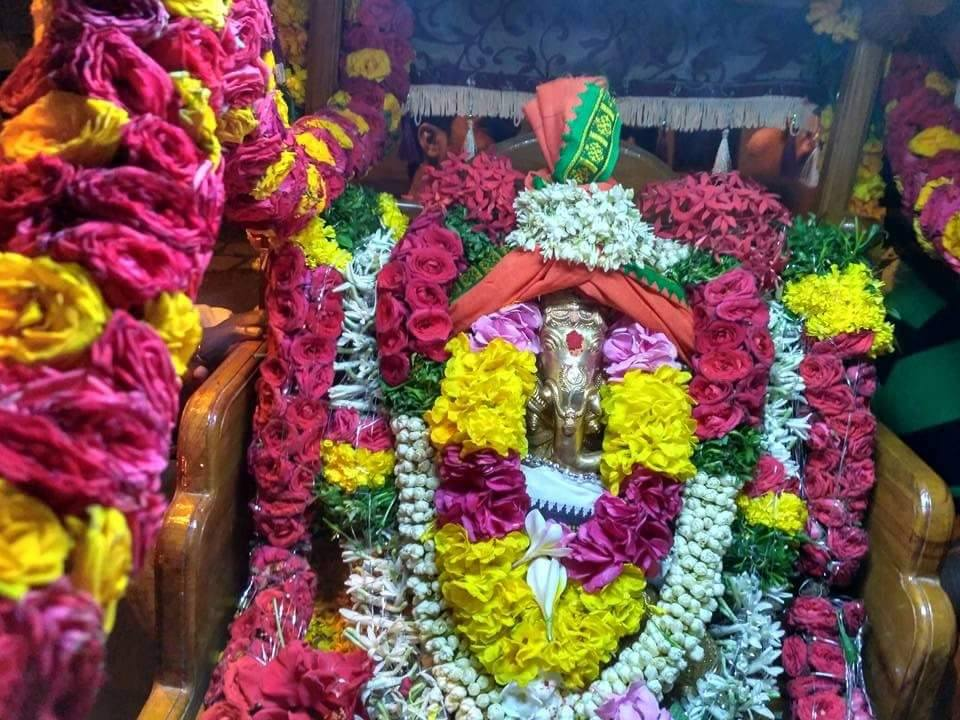
Utsava Moorthy
