= Pali Wine Co. =

American winery located in California

- Location: California, United States

Pali Wine Co. is a Santa Barbara county winery that specializes in Pinot Noir and Chardonnay. Pali Wine Co. was founded by Tim Perr and Scott Knight in 2005. Tim and Scott are the founders of Santa Monica based insurance consulting firm, Perr&Knight.

Pali has tasting rooms located in downtown Santa Barbara, Lompoc and in Little Italy, San Diego.

In the early years of Pali, the winery gained some exposure through local media—including the Palisadian-Post and Los Angeles Times.

Over the years, Pali has gained more national media exposure. Pali Wine Co.'s Huntington Pinot Noir was #86 on Wine Spectator's Top 100 Wines of 2014.

In March 2013, Tim Perr was featured on Fox News discussing the founding of Pali Wine Co.

Tim Perr has been featured as a blogger on the Wine Spectator website.
