= Hero Palli =

Greek opera singer

- Ηρώ Πάλλη
- Born: 19 September 1925; Athens, Greece
- Died: 2000; Athens, Greece
- Education: Conservatoire de Musique de Genève; Vienna Music Academy
- Occupations: Operatic soprano; Academic teacher
- Organizations: Greek National Opera; Athens Conservatoire

Hero Palli, also Iro Palli (1925–2000), was a Greek operatic soprano and voice teacher who made an international career.

== Life and career ==
Palli was born in Athens in 1925 (the bio in the GNO page is wrong). She studied voice first at the Athens Conservatoire, and acting at the drama school of the National Theatre of Greece. She studied further at the Conservatoire de Musique de Genève with Fernando Carpi. While in Geneva she participated in the Geneva International Music Competition, winning the gold medal. She achieved her diploma with honours on 18 June 1952 singing Verdi's Aida, conducted by Samuel Baud-Bovy. It was followed by a recital at the Conservatoire 's hall. She took part in radio broadcasts, and then studied further at the Vienna Music Academy. She sappeared in lead roles at the Greek National Opera, including Puccini's Tosca, and Magda in Menotti's The Consul.

Palli taught voice at the Atheneum Conservatory (that would later become Atheneum Cultural Center) until 1978, and from 1979 at the Athens Conservatoire.

She continued to give recitals, from time to time, at the hall of the Literary Society Parnassos in 1980 and 1984.

In 1992, she was responsible for training the singing actors of the play Cyrano de Bergerac, produced by Jorgos Kimoulis.

Palli married French violinist Yves Hanssen; they had a daughter, Hélène. In 1971 they settled in Greece. Palli died from cancer in Athens in January 2000.
