= Ranjangaon =

Village in Maharashtra

Ranjangaon Ganpati
- town
- Location in Maharashtra, India Ranjangaon Ganpati (India)
- Coordinates: 18°45′N 74°14′E
- Country: India
- State: Maharashtra

Languages
  - Official: Marathi
- Time zone: UTC+5:30 (IST)
- PIN: 412220
- Vehicle registration: MH-12
- Nearest city: Shirur
- Website: pune.nic.in

Ranjangaon is a village in the Pune district of Maharashtra, India, located at a distance of about 50 km from Pune. Located there is the Maharashtra Industrial Development Corporation (MIDC) Industrial area and a shrine to Mahaganapati.

The MIDC in Ranjangoan is an industrial area, in which several manufacturing companies including LG, Whirlpool, Carraro, Fiat, Bombay Dyeing, Maccaferri and Beakaert are based.

The Mahaganapati is considered to be one of the Ashtavinayaka shrines of Maharashtra, celebrating eight instances of legends related to Ganesha.

Mahaganapati at Ranjangaon is believed to have come to the aid of Shiva in destroying the citadels of the demon Tripurasura. According to history, the temple was built between 9th & 10th century. Madhavrao Peshwa made a room in the basement of the temple to keep an idol of Lord Ganesh. Ranjangaon is on Pune Ahemadnagar Highway so many people stop at Mahaganpati.
