= Palle Ydstebø =

Norwegian Army officer and military strategist

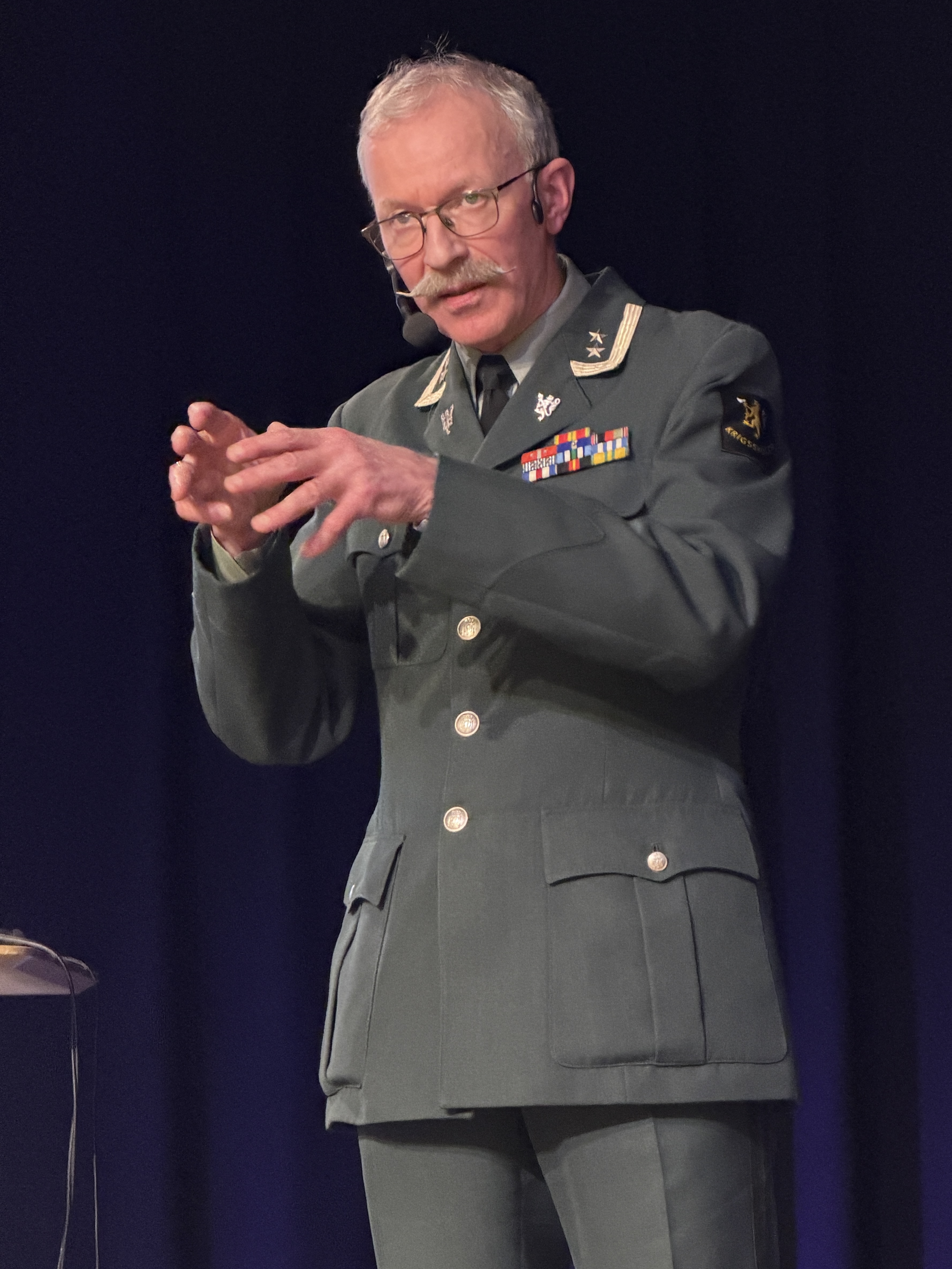
- Palle Ydstebø in 2026

Personal details
- Born: October 15, 1961 (age 64) Ydstebøhamn, Rogaland, Norway
- Website: @pydstebo on Twitter

Military service
- Allegiance: Norway
- Branch/service: Norwegian Army; Royal Norwegian Air Force
- Rank: Oberstløytnant
- Battles/wars: War in Afghanistan (ISAF)

Palle Ydstebø (born 1961) is a retired Norwegian Army lieutenant colonel, advisor at the Norwegian Military Academy, and military strategist.

== Biography ==
According to Ydstebø, his unusual given name of "Palle" was handed down for generations from a certain official sent by the Danish government who settled on Kvitsøy in the 17th century.

Ydstebø's studies focused on strategy at the operational level. He is also an expert on geopolitics and landpower, as well as a specialist on the Soviet Union, North Korea, and Israel. He has also written on NATO planning in the Arctic.

After the Russian invasion of Ukraine in 2022, Ydstebø frequently appeared in Norwegian media as a military expert on the Russo-Ukrainian War. In 2023, he was awarded the Norwegian Army Medal of Merit for his efforts to make information about the Russian invasion of Ukraine accessible to the public.

== See also ==
- Martti J. Kari
