= Bohra Ganesh Temple =

Hindu Temple

- Location in Udaipur

Religion
- Affiliation: Hinduism
- District: Udaipur district

Location
- Location: Udaipur
- State: Rajasthan
- Country: India
- Interactive map of Bohra Ganesh Temple
- Coordinates: 24°35′22.455″N 73°43′39.6798″E

Bohra Ganesh Temple is a Hindu temple dedicated to the god Ganesh. It is situated near Mohanlal Sukhadia University in Udaipur.

== General ==
The Bohra Ganesh Temple is located on the Bohra Ganesh Road, near the Govt. Ahad Museum near Dhoolkot area in Udaipur. At the center of this temple, there is an east facing idol of the god in a dancing posture. This temple earns the same respect in Udaipur, as the Moti Dungari temple in Jaipur.

=== Ganesh Chaturthi ===
Ganesh Chaturthi, the Hindu festival celebrated in honor of Ganesha, is celebrated as an auspicious event at Bohra Ganesh Temple. On this day, the temple is open from midnight till early morning, and witnesses around 2 - 2.5 lakh disciples visiting the temple.

=== Annakoot celebrations ===
Govardhan Puja or Annakoot, celebrated just after Diwali, is an auspicious event at Bohra Ganesh Temple. On this day, devotees offer 'Chappan Bhog' (meaning 56 dishes) to the deity at Bohra Ganesh Temple. A ritual called 'Aangi' is performed at early dawn, followed by the Chappan Bhog feast offers to Ganesha. In the evening, priests performs the 'Maha Aarti' (meaning great worship), and then offers prasada to the devotees.

== History ==
Bohra Ganesh Temple is believed to be about 350 years old. Originally named as Borganesh, the temple was built outside the then city boundary of Udaipur. But since then, due to expansion of city boundaries, this area now falls within under the city limits. Now the entire area is also known as Bohra Ganesh. This new name of this temple also has an interesting story behind. It is believed that 70–80 years ago people who needed money for purposes like marriage and business would write the requirement on a slip of paper and leave it before the idol. Soon he would get the amount needed, but in turn they had to return the amount with interest. In India, it is generally the Bohra cast which is involved in business of lending money. For this reason, Ganesh here was named as Bohra Ganesh. However, it is also a common belief that devotees with real trust on Bohra Ganesh also get their wishes fulfilled.

== Access and timings ==
The Bohra Ganesh Temple, located on the Bohra Ganesh Road, is around 2 km from city center, and 4 km from Udaipur City railway station.

Visit timings for this temple are as follows:

- Monday - Friday: 6.00 AM - 8.00 PM
- Saturday: 6.00 AM - 8.00 PM
- Sunday: 6.00 AM - 8.00 PM
- Public Holidays: 6.00 AM - 8.00 PM
