= Sree Indilayappan Temple =

Hindu temple in Kerala, India

Sree Indilayappan Temple, Marayikkodu
- ശ്രീ ഇണ്ടിളയപ്പൻ ക്ഷേത്രം, മാരായിക്കോട്
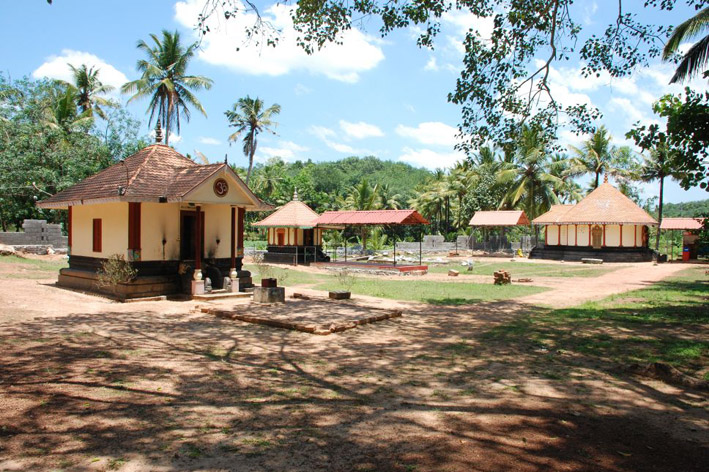
- Sree Indilayappan Temple

- Location in Kerala

Religion
- Affiliation: Hinduism
- District: Kollam
- Deity: Shiva and Vishnu

Location
- Location: Kottarakkara
- State: Kerala
- Country: India
- Interactive map of Sree Indilayappan Temple, Marayikkodu
- Coordinates: 8°59′36″N 76°48′29″E

Architecture
- Type: South Indian
- Creator: The Temple
- Temple: 2

Website
- http://marayikkodu.org

Marayikkodu Sree Indilayappan Kshethram (മലയാളം:ഇണ്ടിളയപ്പൻ ക്ഷേത്രം, മാരായിക്കോട്) is a 1500-year-old Hindu temple in South India. Non-Hindus are permitted in the temple. It is in Karickom, 5 km from Kottarakara.

== Temple ==
Shiva (Shiva Lingam), Devi Parvathy and Vishnu are the main deities of this temple. The sub-deities of the temple are Ganesh, Nagarajavu & Nagayakshi, Brahmarakshas and Yakshi.
