= Ranjangaon Ganpati =

One of the Ashtavinayak temples of the Hindu deity Ganesha

Coordinates: 18°45′N 74°14′E

Ranjangaon Ganpati also known as Shri Mahaganpati Temple is a Hindu temple dedicated to Lord Ganesha, one of the most revered deities in Hinduism. Situated in the village of Ranjangaon within the Shirur taluka of Pune district, Maharashtra, India. It is one of the eight Ashtavinayak temples venerating Lord Ganesha, bearing immense religious importance in Hinduism.

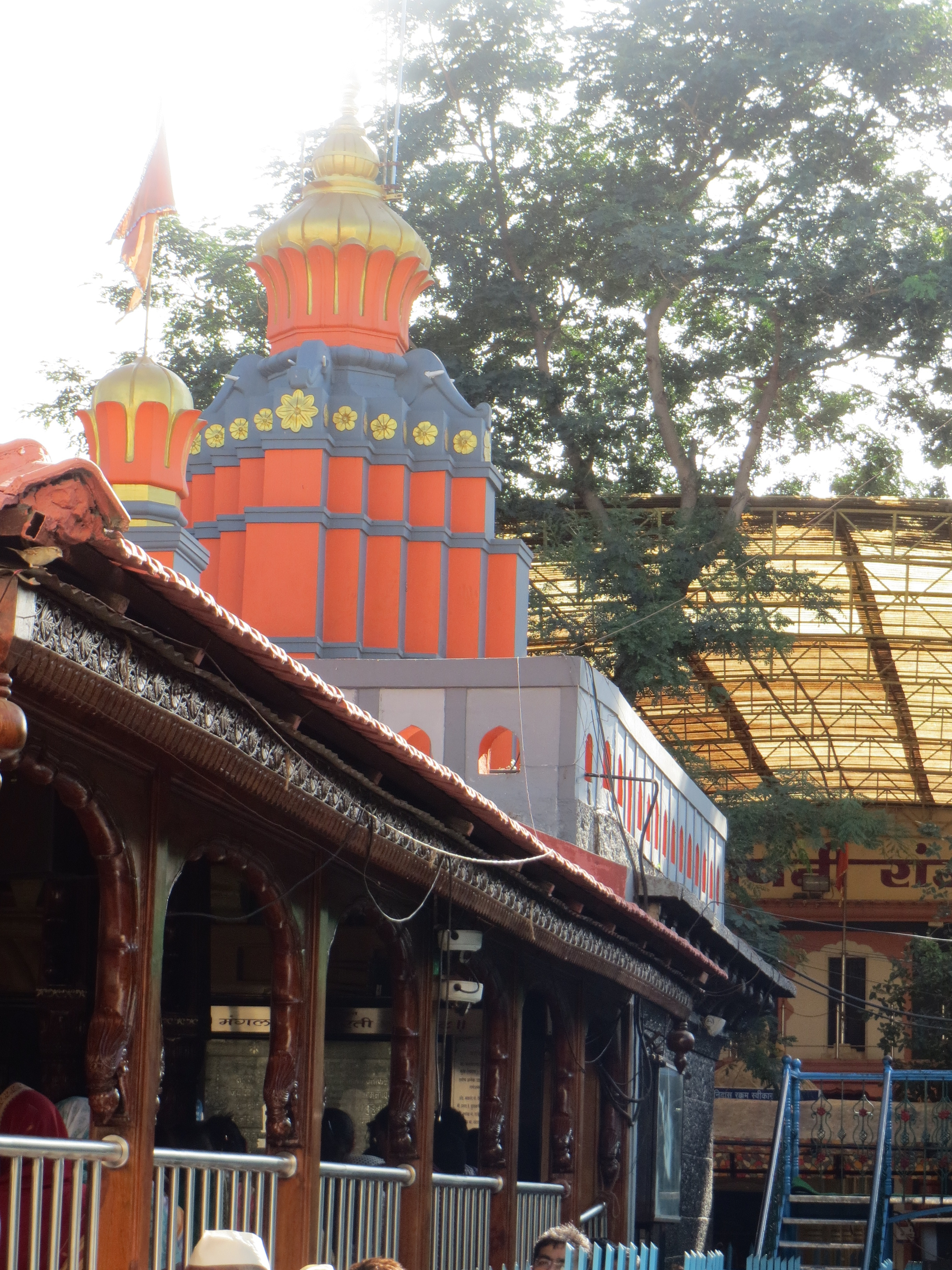
The shikhara above the sanctum in the Mahaganapati temple

The Ganpati idol in the temple was unveiled and gifted by the "Khollam" family, renowned goldsmiths from Ranjangaon. Constructed between the 9th and 10th centuries, the main temple appears to have been built during the Peshwa era. Positioned atop the entrance gate is the Nagarkhana. The temple, oriented towards the east, has a grand entrance gate.

Madhavrao I made a room in the basement of the temple to keep the idol of lord Ganesha. Later on Sardar Kibe of Indore renovated it. The idol of the lord Ganesh is also named as 'Mahotkat', and it is said that the idol has 10 trunks and 20 hands.

While going from the Pune – Nagar highway the route is Pune – Koregaon – then via Shikrapur; Rajangaon is 21 km before Shirur. From Pune it is 50 km.

In early 1990s, Government of Maharashtra established an industrial zone (MIDC) on the land acquired from the nearby villages and the industrial establishment is known as Ranjangaon MIDC. It host many multinational manufacturing companies like Whirlpool, LG to name a few.
