= Sri Sampath Vinayagar Temple =

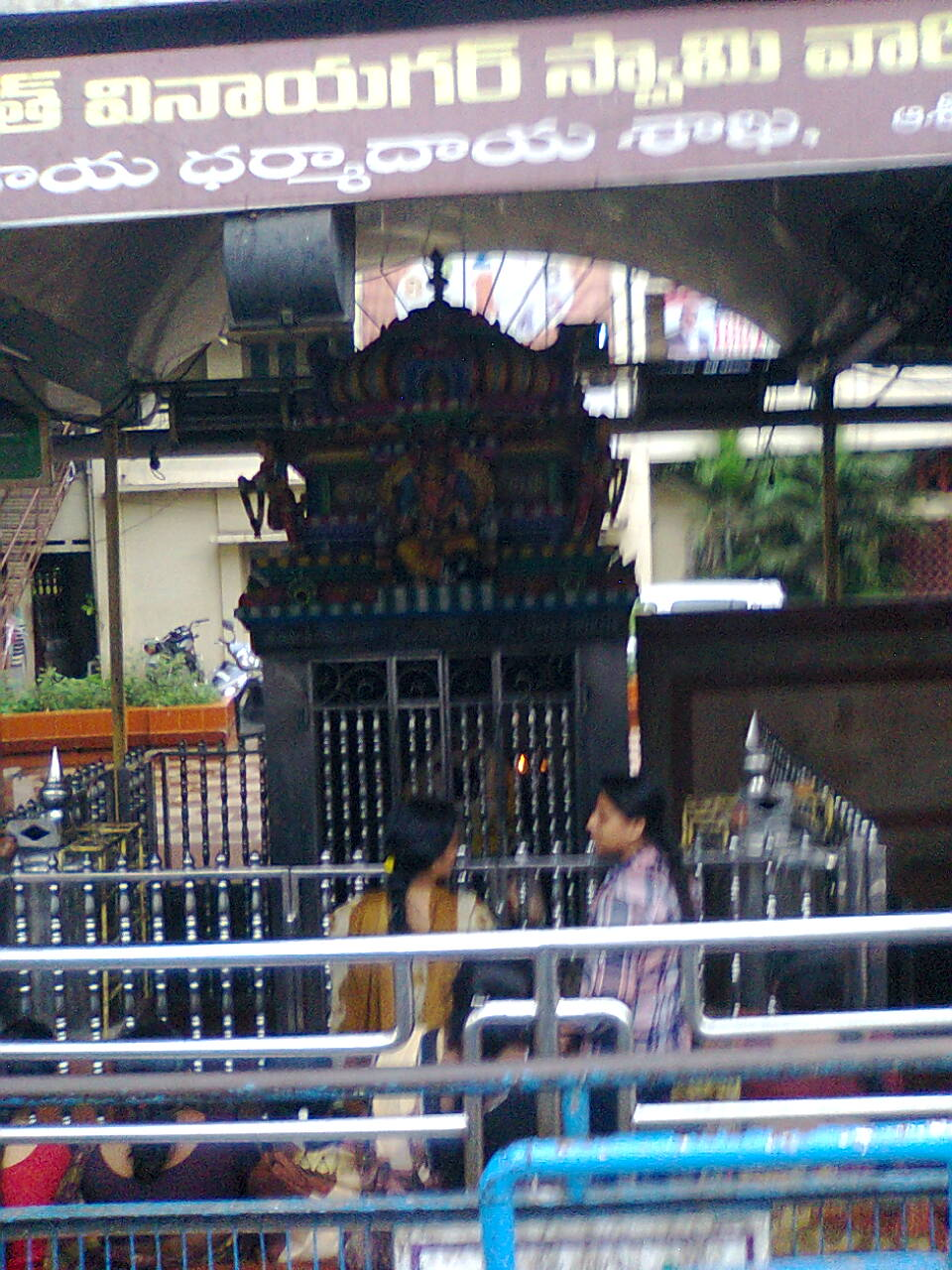
- Sri Sampath Vinayagar Temple

- Location in Visakhapatnam

Religion
- Affiliation: Hinduism
- Deity: Ganesha

Location
- Location: Visakhapatnam
- State: Andhra Pradesh
- Country: India
- Interactive map of Sri Sampath Vinayagar Temple
- Coordinates: 17.724702°N 83.312717°E

Sri Sampath Vinayagar is the prominent deity of Visakhapatnam locals. The temple is located in Asilmetta of Visakhapatnam city.

== History ==
This temple was built in 1962 by Arcot Mudaliar brothers - T.S. Rajeshwaran and T.S. Selvaganesan later it comes under Endowments Department of Andhara Pradesh. Local people still believe that during Indo-Pakistani War of 1971 this temple saved city from attack of PNS Ghazi and sank that submarine in the coast of Visakhapatnam.

== About ==
Sampath Vinayagar Temple is very popular. In this region, people still follow the custom to perform ritual of any newly purchased vehicle. This temple is situated at one of the busiest areas in city and every year Ganesh Chaturthi is celebrated in a great pomp. People believe this as a lucky temple of the city
