= Pali, Karjat =

Village in Maharashtra

Pali is a small village in the Raigad district of Maharashtra, India.

The village is situated on the edge of the river namely 'Pej'. It has a population of around 2000. The village is surrounded by mountains on three sides and has a pleasant climate with perennial flowing clean water. It has abundant medicinal plants.
