= Albert Palle =

Albert Palle (14 September 1916 Le Havre (Seine-Maritime) - 8 March 2007 Paris) was a French writer, and winner of the 1959 Prix Renaudot.

== Life ==
He was a friend of Raymond Aron, and student of Jean-Paul Sartre. He fought in the resistance and was awarded the Croix de guerre. He wrote for the paper Le Combat, France Dimanche, and Elle.

== Works ==
- L'expérience: roman, R. Julliard, 1959
  - Die Erfahrung: Roman, Rowohlt, 1961
  - Experience, Doubleday, 1961
- Les marches: roman, Julliard, 1962
- Les chaudières et la lune: roman, R. Julliard, 1965
- Les mots perdus: nouvelles, Éd. du Cercle des amis des livres, 1994, ISBN 978-2-910213-02-2
