= A. Annapura =

- village
- Location in Karnataka, India A. Annapura (India)
- Coordinates: 14.270455°N 75.353079°E
- Country: India
- State: Karnataka
- District: Shimoga
- Talukas: Shikarpur

Government
  - Body: Village Panchayat

Languages
  - Official: Kannada
- Time zone: UTC+5:30 (IST)
- Nearest city: Shimoga
- Civic agency: Village Panchayat

A. Annapura is a village in the southern state of Karnataka, India. It is located in the Shikarpur taluk of Shimoga district in Karnataka.

== See also ==
- Shimoga
- Districts of Karnataka
