= Anesara =

- Village
- Country: India
- State: Karnataka
- District: Shimoga district
- Tehsil: Shimoga Tehsil
- Time zone: UTC+5:30 (IST)

Anesara is a village located in Shimoga district of Karnataka, India.

== Geography ==
The total geographical area of Anesara is 387.1 hectares, which makes it one of the biggest villages by area in Shimoga.
