= Adaganti =

- village
- Nickname: Adt
- Location in Karnataka, India Adaganti (India)
- Coordinates: 14.395320°N 75.334810°E
- Country: India
- State: Karnataka
- District: Shimoga
- Talukas: Shikarpur

Government
  - Body: Village Panchayat

Languages
  - Official: Kannada
- Time zone: UTC+5:30 (IST)
- Nearest city: Shimoga
- Civic agency: Village Panchayat

Adaganti is a village in the southern state of Karnataka, India. It is located in the Shikarpur taluk of Shimoga district in Karnataka.

== See also ==
- Shimoga
- Districts of Karnataka
