= Shimoga Institute of Medical Sciences =

Medical college in Shimoga, Karnataka, India

Shivamogga Institute of Medical Sciences
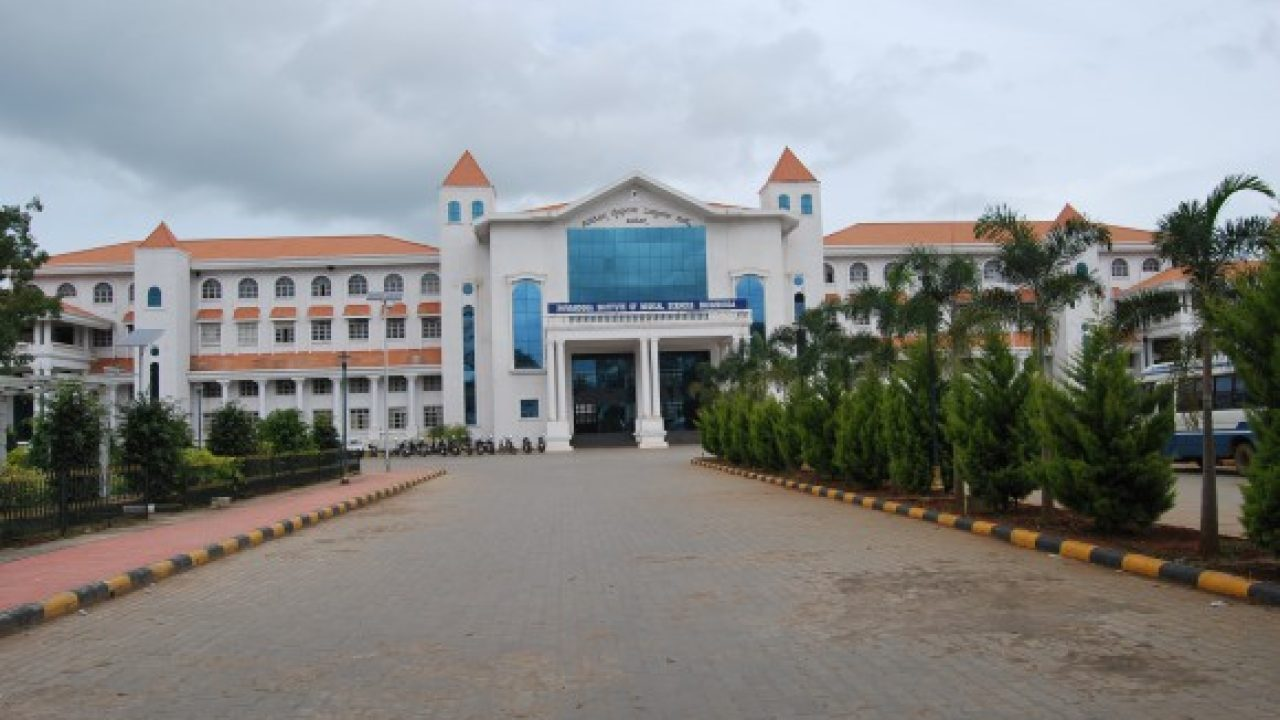
- Motto: Health is wealth
- Type: Medical College and Hospital
- Established: 2005; 21 years ago
- Affiliations: Rajiv Gandhi University of Health Sciences, NMC
- Director: Dr. Ramesh Babu K.
- Location: Shivamogga, Karnataka, India; 13.932710°N 75.566761°E
- Website: sims.karnataka.gov.in/english/%20sims.karnataka.gov.in
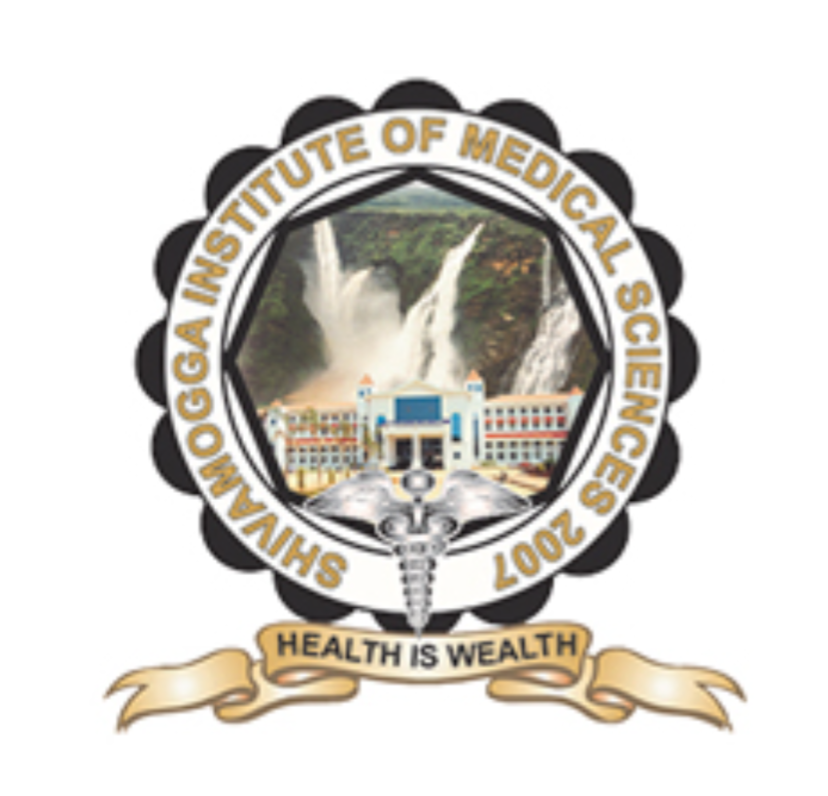

Shivamogga Institute of Medical Sciences (SIMS) is a government medical college and teaching hospital located in Shivamogga, Karnataka, India. Established in 2005, the institute is affiliated with the Rajiv Gandhi University of Health Sciences and recognised by the National Medical Commission. SIMS offers undergraduate (MBBS), postgraduate (MD/MS), diploma and allied health sciences courses, and is attached to the Government McGann Hospital for clinical training and healthcare services.

== History ==
Shivamogga Institute of Medical Sciences was established in 2005 by the Government of Karnataka to expand access to quality medical education and tertiary healthcare services in central Karnataka. The institute was developed on land within the premises of the Government McGann Hospital, itself a historic public hospital in Shivamogga.

== Campus and Facilities ==
The SIMS campus is located on Sagar Road along the Bangalore–Honnavar National Highway (NH 206) in Shivamogga. It extends over approximately 25 acres and includes academic buildings, laboratories, lecture theatres, demonstration rooms, a central library, an auditorium, and separate hostel facilities for male and female students. The institute’s clinical wing is integrated with the Government McGann Hospital, which provides extensive inpatient and outpatient services across multiple specialties.

== Academics ==
=== Undergraduate programmes ===
SIMS offers the Bachelor of Medicine, Bachelor of Surgery (MBBS) degree with an annual intake of approximately 150 students. Admission to the MBBS program is through the National Eligibility cum Entrance Test (NEET-UG), followed by counselling under the Karnataka Examinations Authority and the Medical Counselling Committee quotas.

=== Postgraduate programmes ===
The institute provides Doctor of Medicine (MD) and Master of Surgery (MS) degrees in various clinical and pre-clinical specialities, with admissions through the NEET-PG examination.

=== Allied Health Sciences and Diploma Courses ===
SIMS offers allied health science bachelor’s degrees in fields such as cardiac care technology, anesthesia & operation theatre technology, medical laboratory technology, and medical imaging, along with diploma courses in allied medical technologies.

== Teaching Hospital ==
=== Government McGann Teaching District Hospital ===
The Government McGann Teaching District Hospital, commonly known as McGann Hospital, serves as the teaching hospital of Shimoga Institute of Medical Sciences (SIMS) in Shivamogga, Karnataka with 950 beds.

The hospital was constructed between 1932 and 1935 during the pre-independence period in the erstwhile Mysore State. The foundation stone was laid on 16 January 1932 by Maharaja Krishnaraja Wadiyar IV. The hospital was named in honour of Dr. Thomas George McGann, a Scottish surgeon who served in Shimoga for over three decades and contributed significantly to public health services in the Malnad region, particularly in the control of malaria.

Over the years, the hospital was expanded and upgraded by the Government of Karnataka and developed into a district-level referral hospital. It currently provides multi-specialty inpatient and outpatient services including general medicine, general surgery, obstetrics and gynaecology, paediatrics, orthopaedics, dermatology, psychiatry, radiology, anaesthesiology and emergency services.

McGann Hospital functions as the primary clinical training centre for undergraduate students, interns, and postgraduate residents of SIMS, offering structured clinical rotations and hands-on training across major medical disciplines.

== Departments ==
- Anatomy
- Physiology
- Biochemistry
- Pharmacology
- Pathology
- Microbiology
- Forensic medicine
- Community Medicine
- General medicine
- Pediatric
- TB and Chest
- Skin & V D
- Psychiatry
- General surgery
- Orthopedics
- ENT
- Ophthalmology
- OBG
- Anesthesia
- Radiology

== Affiliation and Recognition ==
Shimoga Institute of Medical Sciences is affiliated with the Rajiv Gandhi University of Health Sciences (RGUHS), Karnataka and recognised by the National Medical Commission (NMC) for its MBBS, MD, MS, and allied health science courses.

== See also ==
- All India Institute of Medical Sciences, New Delhi
- Rajiv Gandhi University of Health Sciences
- List of medical colleges in Karnataka
