= Barkana Falls =

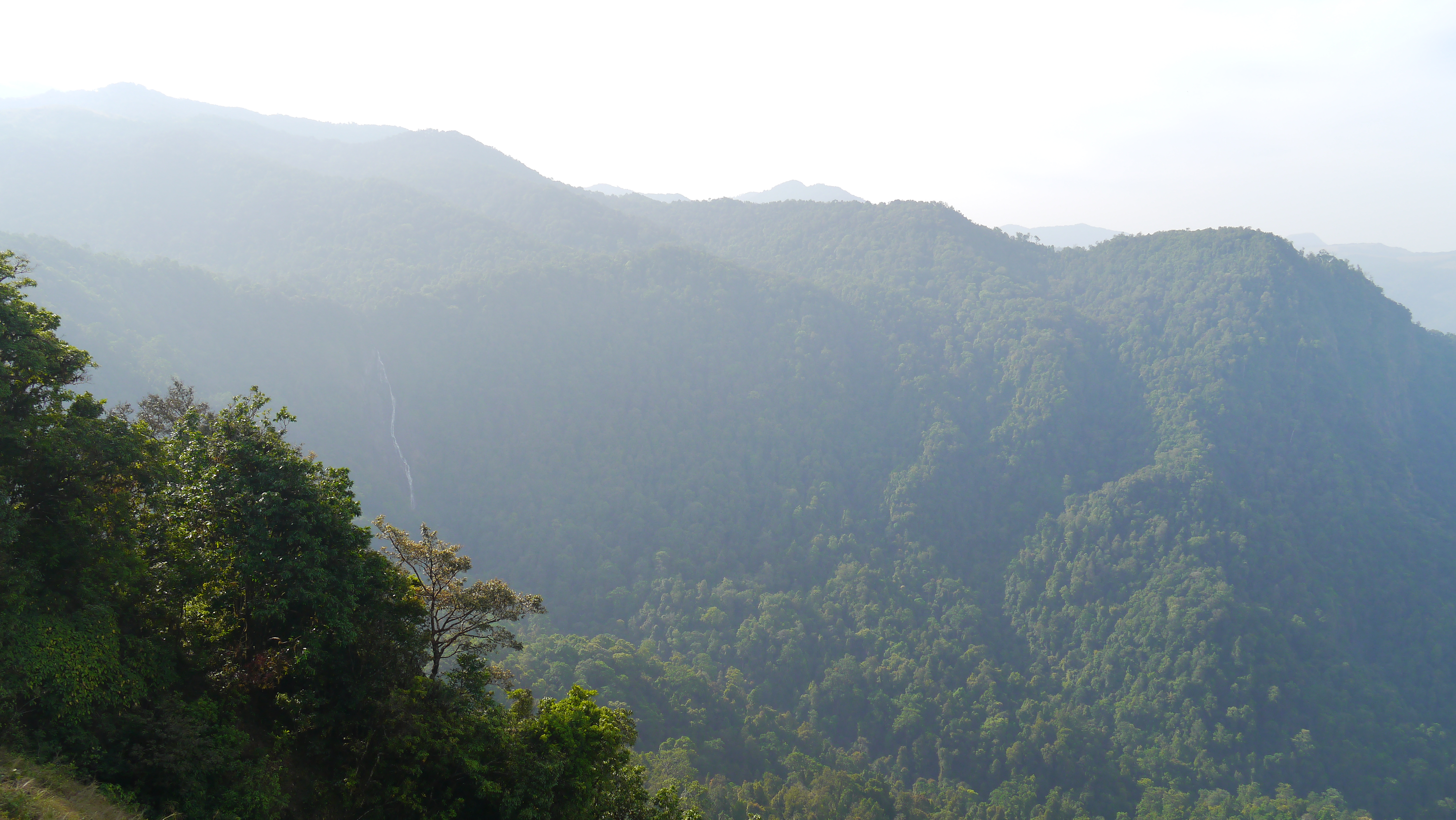
- Barkana Falls as seen from Agumbe Sunset point
- Location: Agumbe, Shimoga District, Karnataka
- Type: Tiered
- Total height: 259 metres (850 ft)
- Watercourse: Seetha River
- World height ranking: 353

The Barkana Falls, formed by Seetha River, is a waterfall located near Agumbe in Shimoga district of state of Karnataka, India and the water falls is among the ten highest waterfalls in India. This water fall region is filled with water only during rainy season.

== The falls ==
Barkana Falls is located at a distance of 10 kilometres (6.2 mi) from Agumbe and has a height of about 500 feet and the area is surrounded by a thick forest of Western Ghats.

== See also ==
- List of waterfalls
- List of waterfalls in India
- List of waterfalls in India by height
- Mangalore
