= Alada Halli, Shimoga =

Alada Halli
- village
- Alada Halli, Shimoga is in Shimoga district
- Country: India
- State: Karnataka
- District: Shimoga
- Talukas: Shimoga

Government
  - Body: Village Panchayat

Languages
  - Official: Kannada
- Time zone: UTC+5:30 (IST)
- Nearest city: Shimoga
- Civic agency: Village Panchayat

Alada Halli, Shivamogga is a village in the southern state of Karnataka, India. It is located in the Shivamogga taluk of Shimoga district in Karnataka. It is 12 km away from Shivamogga.

== See also ==
- Districts of Karnataka
- Shivamogga
- Mangalore
