= Kulavalli =

Coordinates: 14°20′N 75°09′E

Kulavalli kulavalli
- Village
- Interactive map of Kulavalli
- Country: India
- State: Karnataka
- District: Shimoga

Languages
  - Official: Kannada
- Time zone: UTC+5:30 (IST)

Kulavalli is a village in Belgaum district in Karnataka, India.
