= Ashok Gudigar =

Indian sculptor

Ashok Gudigar (born 1965) is a sculptor who specialises in making statues out of sandalwood, stone, metal, and fiberglass. He hails from Sagara, Shimoga District, Karnataka, India, and lives in Bangalore.

== Early life and education ==
After studying up to 7th standard, with the support of his father and family members, Gudigar started sculpting in wood as per family practice. He studied sculpting for several years under the guidance of Devalakunda Vadiraj in Bangalore, and there he developed expertise in other mediums such as bronze, clay, ivory, plaster of Paris, granite, soapstone and others. He was also involved in development of traditional art in association with "Koushalya", an art platform.

He has participated in International sculpture festival arranged in England during 1998.

== Sculptures ==
The Bahubali statue carved by Ashok Gudigar and his team, measuring 41 feet, is one of the biggest stone statues of the world. It is displayed in Singadh village, Siroh Taluk, Bhavnagar District, Gujarat. Originally it was proposed to carved 51 feet height Bahubali, but as it was to be transported from Bidadi, Bangalore to Gujarat, it was reduced to 41 feet due to concerns about road conditions and the strength of bridges on which it was to be transported. He has also sculpted Lord Hanuman Statue, established in Haridwar, a Ganesha idol, and others.

=== Other major sculptures ===
Gudigar has also made an 8.5 foot tall bronze Gandhi Statue, which is erected in the Garden of Peace at the University of Michigan–Flint, USA.

Statue	Height	Medium	For / at	Year
Gandhi Statue	8.5 feet	Metal	University of Michigan–Flint, US	2010
Sarvajna	7 feet	Metal	Abalur, Shimoga dist.	2009
Onke Obavva	8 feet	Metal	Chitradurga Karnataka	
Anjaneya	28.5 feet	stone	Chennai	
Venugopalaswamy statue	4.5 feet		Germany	
Ganesha statue	13+12 feet	stone	Kukke Subramanya	

He has started sculpting 100 feet tall stone statue of Swami Vivekananda which will be erected at Bailur village, Udupi District by 2016.

== Awards ==
- Kamaladevi Chattopadhya Vishwakarma Award - 1986 for Ganesha idol of black stone
- State award for "Rama Pattabhisheka" -wood work - 1989.
- National Award (1992) for "Venugopala" statue, Surahonne wood work.
- Rajyotsava Award by Government of Karnataka - 2010.

== See also ==
- Vijay Gaur
