= Seetha River =

River in Karnataka, India

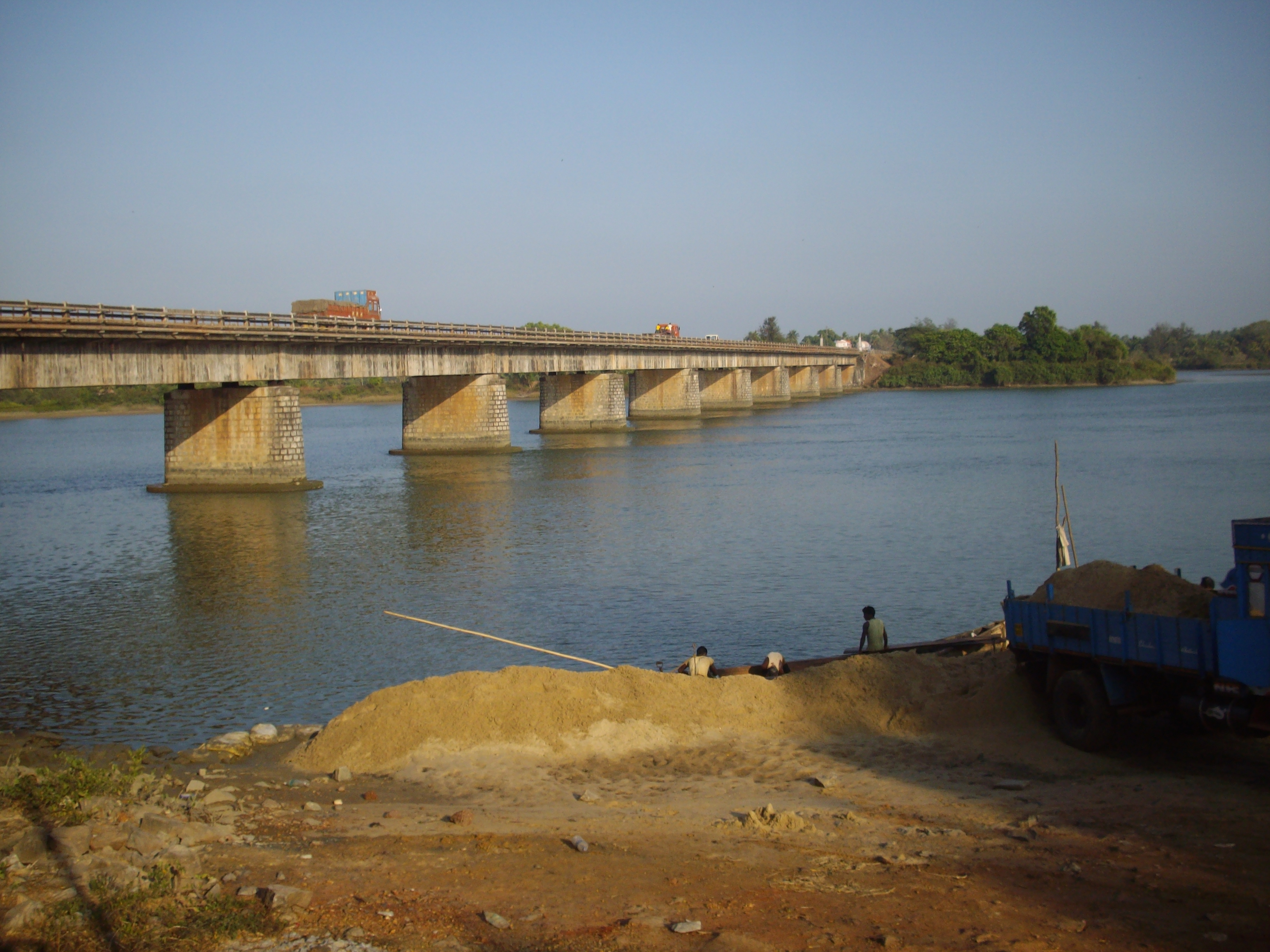
Mabukal bridge on the Seetha river

Seetha river, also spelled Sita and Sitha, is a west flowing river located in Karnataka state, India, which flows mainly in Udupi district.

== Flow ==
The river originates near Narasimha Parvatha peak and passes through Agumbe forests and flows near Hebri, Avarse, Kokkarne, Barkur and joins Suvarna river, before joining Arabian Sea. Water flows in the river rises to high levels during monsoon rains. The river and its smaller tributaries have made several water falls like Kudlu falls, Barkana falls, Jomlu Thirtha falls. River rafting is undertaken by adventure lovers during June to October, with the coordination of government agencies.
