= Kudlu Falls =

Kudlu Falls (also spelled Kudlu Teertha ) is in Udupi district, in the Western Ghats in Karnataka. It is located 42 km away from Udupi, 208 km from the Madikeri, 268 km from Bangalore and 296 km from Mysore.

Kudlu Falls, along with Hidlumane and Belkal Theertha, are the three main waterfalls in Mangaluru district in Karnataka.
