= T. G. McGann =

Terence Joseph McGann Born 15 April 1843, in Whitemount, Kilnaboy, Co. Clare, was a senior surgeon in Princely state of Mysore, India. He was senior surgeon with Government of Mysore from 1885 to 1896 and he later appointed as official doctor to Maharaja of Mysore and his family, the Darbar Surgeon from 1905 to 1906. He put efforts to improve the lives of native people, tried to prevent epidemics like cholera and impressed upon the Government about "the importance of improving village sanitation,....improving and conversing the water supply and promoting general cleanliness, by preventing the storage of manure in the streets and backyards of houses, the defilement of ground in and immediately around towns and villages would be a distinct gain, would improve the general health of people, diminish their liability to fevers, bovel complaints and cholera, and tend to check the spread of the last named disease on its occurrence amongst them".

McGann worked in Shimoga hospital maintained by Mysore Government and exclusively worked to control Malaria which was rampant in the area during 19th century. He worked in Shimoga for more than three decades and retired in 1908, returned to United Kingdom, but again came back to Mysore and stayed there till his death on 22 November 1936.

== McGann Hospital ==
A Hospital in memory of McGann was constructed at Shimoga, (a part of Mysore State) during 1932-1935 and it is called McGANN Hospital, Shimoga. The foundation stone for the hospital was laid by then Maharaja of Mysore, Krishna Raja Wadiyar IV on 16 January 1932. The hospital was developed during later decades, by Government of Karnataka as a Government run hospital with good medical facilities and it is also attached to a Medical College during first decade of 21st Century (2007) and managed by Government Departments.
