= Khadi Shankarappa =

K. Shankarappa (1915 – 27 April 2005), known as Khadi Shankarappa, was an Indian senior freedom fighter and khādī (cotton) worker in Karnataka, based at Shimoga, India. He started his service for the cause of khadi from 1930 onwards in Shimoga. He and S.R. Nagapps Shetty started Sudarshana Khadi Nilaya in Shimoga. Both of them served the cause of khadi and freedom movement.

At that time khadi bhandars were the meeting points of congressman and freedom fighters. The freedom movement spread through khadi or in the guise of khadi, started in the sudarshana khadi nilaya concerning Malnad districts.

Shankarappa was jailed several times. Much of his activity was underground. He was a congress party messenger between towns in the Malnad districts. He carried messages, distributed handwritten papers, letters and confidential information to the congress workers. He was recognized as Khadi Shankarappa as a result of his work for and devotion to the movement.

After Indian independence, Shankarappa retired from active politics. He served as the manager of Shimoga khadi bhandar. He also devoted his attention to the co-operative movement in Shimoga District. He published his memories in his autobiography titled "Antharya" in 1999. He died on 27 April 2005 in Shimoga at the age of 90 leaving behind his wife Smt. Sharadamma and three sons and three daughters. As a mark of respect to the departed soul, both the houses of Karnataka Legislature paid rich tributes to him by a resolution on 31 July 2005 remembering the services and sacrifice of the great freedom fighter.
