= Shimoga district =

District of Karnataka, India

- District of Karnataka
- Shivamogga district
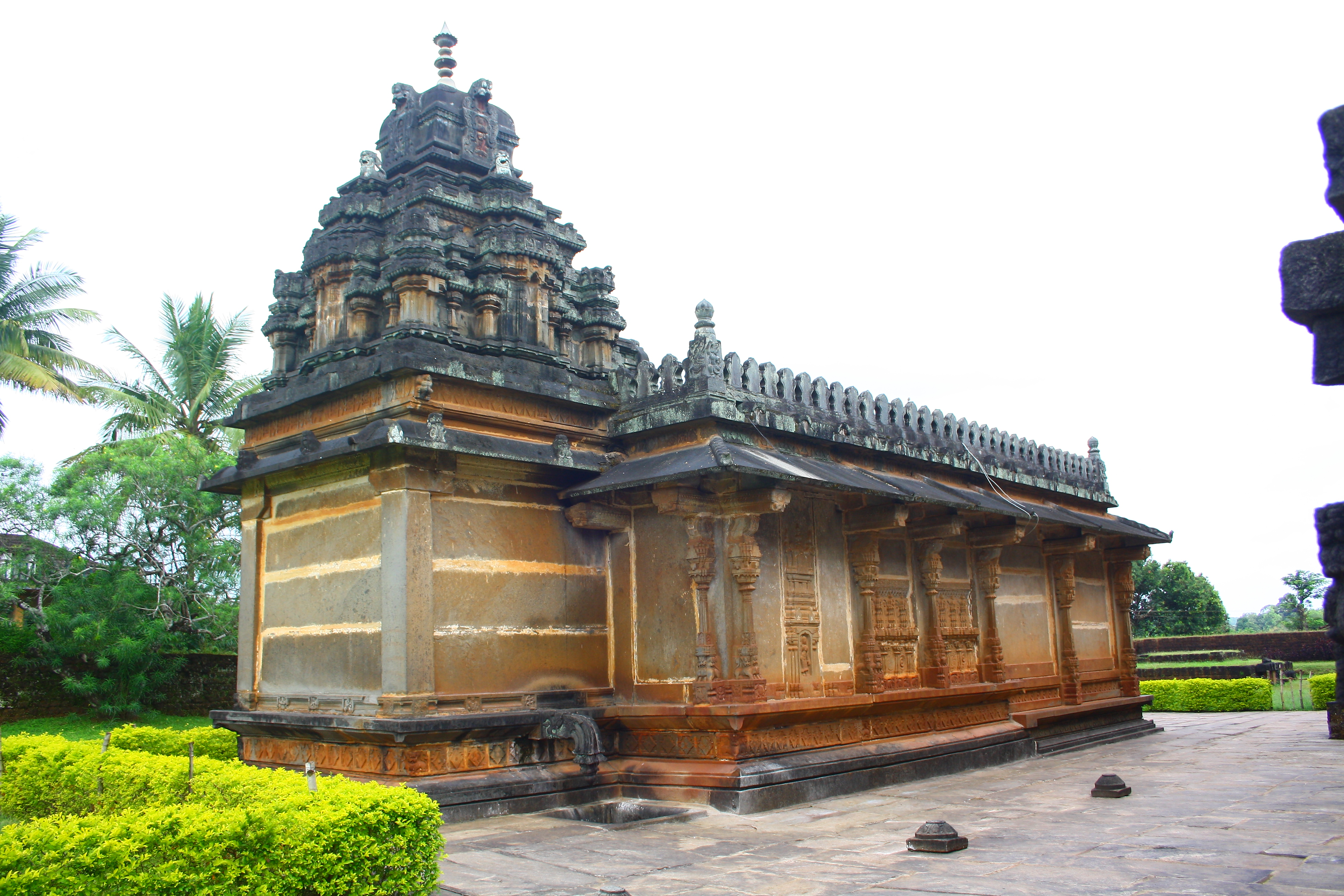
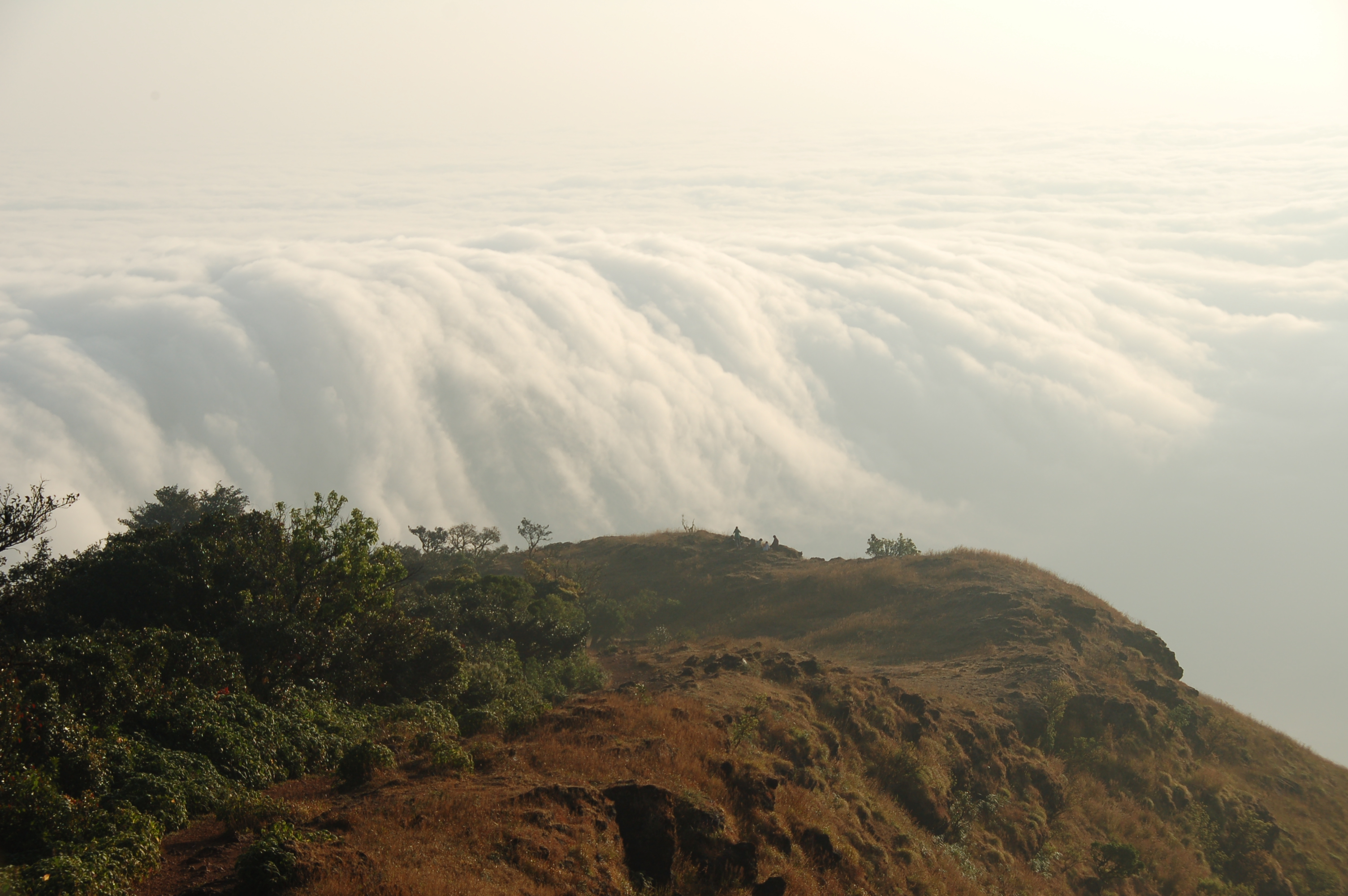
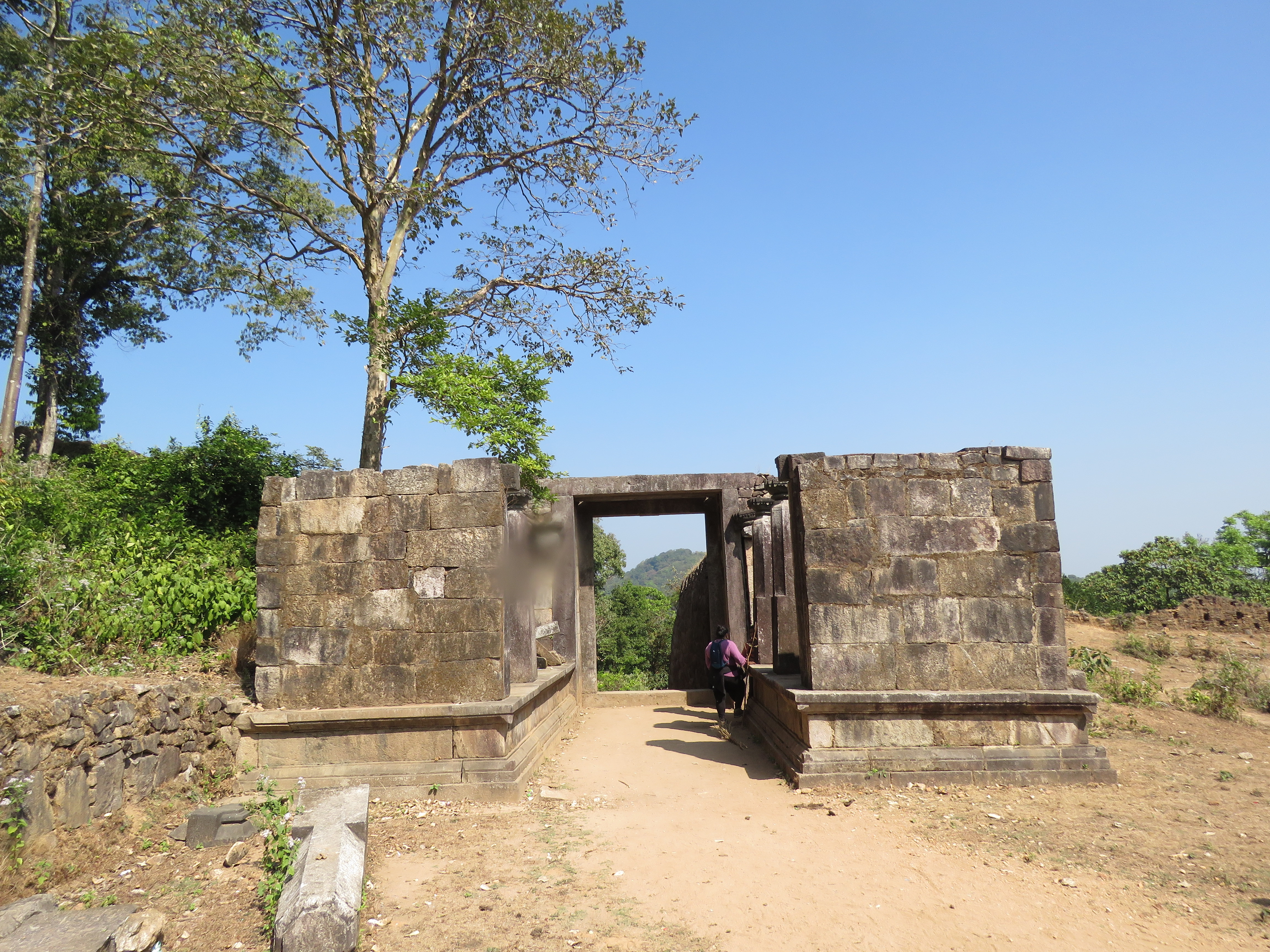
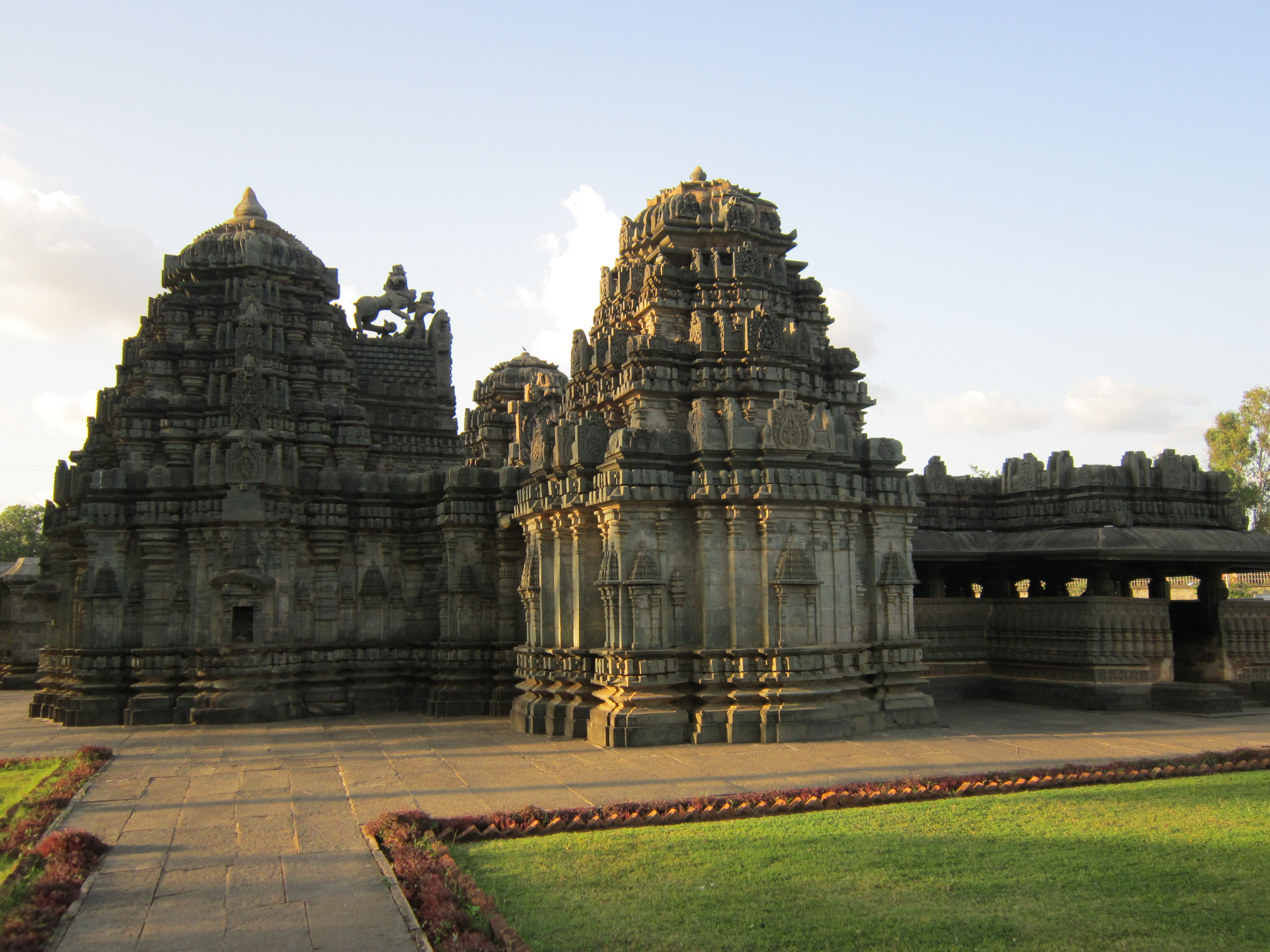
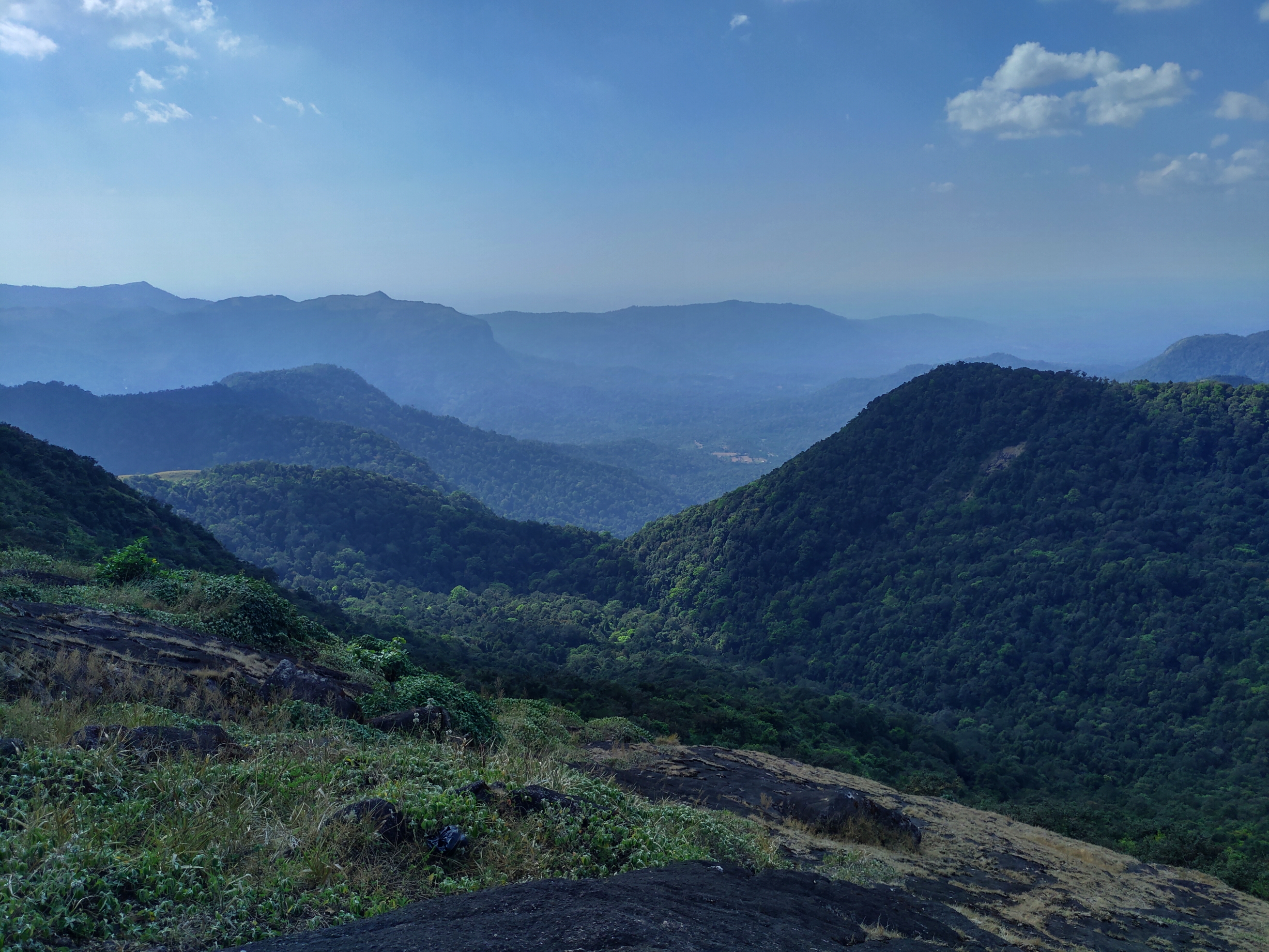
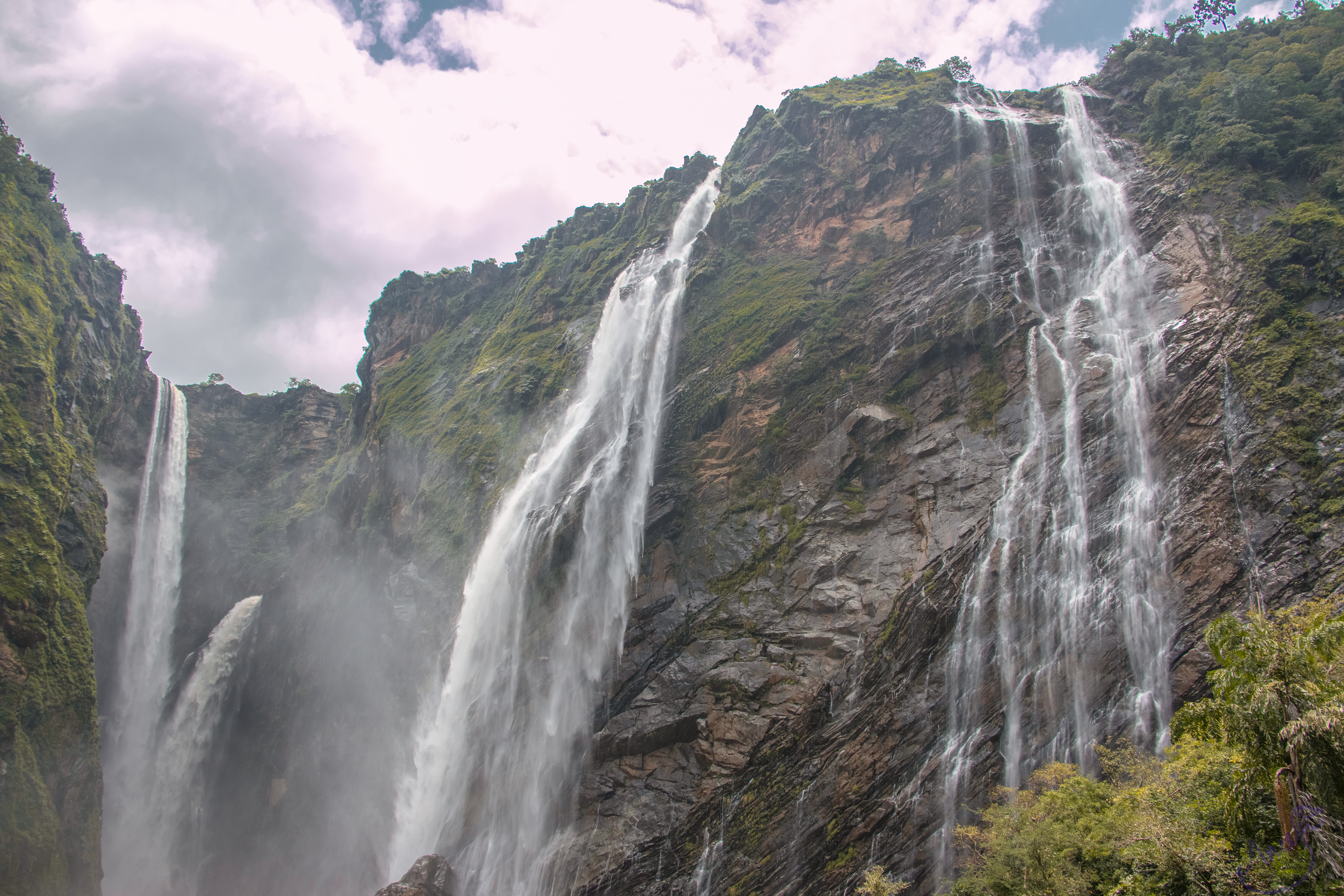
- Clockwise from top-left: Aghoreshwara Temple in Ikkeri, View of Western Ghats near Kodachadri, Kedareswara Temple, Agumbe, Kavaledurga Fort, Jog Falls
- Nickname: Gateway to Malnad
- Location in Karnataka
- Coordinates: 14.00°N 75.28°E
- Country: India
- State: Karnataka
- Administration Division: Bengaluru
- Established: 1 November 1956
- Headquarters: Shimoga
- Talukas: Shimoga, Sagara, Shikaripura, Soraba, Hosanagara, Bhadravathi, Thirthahalli

Government
  - Superintendent of Police: G. K. Mithun Kumar, IPS
  - Deputy Commissioner and District Magistrate: Gurudatta Hegade (IAS)

Area
  - Total: 8,495 km^{2} (3,280 sq mi)

Population (2011)
  - Total: 1,752,753
  - Density: 207/km^{2} (540/sq mi)

Languages
  - Official: Kannada
- Time zone: UTC+5:30 (IST)
- Vehicle registration: Shimoga KA-14; Sagara KA-15
- Website: shivamogga.nic.in

Shimoga district (Kannada: [ʃiʋɐmoɡːɐ], officially known as Shivamogga district), is a district in the Karnataka state of India. A major part of Shimoga district lies in the Malnad region or the Sahyadri. Shimoga city is its administrative centre. As of 2011 Shimoga district has a population of 17,52,753. There are seven taluks: Soraba, Sagara, Hosanagar, Shimoga, Shikaripura, Thirthahalli, and Bhadravathi. Channagiri and Honnali were part of Shimoga district until 1997 when they became part of the newly formed Davanagere district.

== Origin of name ==
Shivamogga was previously known as Mandli. There are legends about how the name Shivamogga has evolved. According to one, the name Shivamogga is related to the Hindu God Shiva. Shiva-Mukha (Face of Shiva), Shivana-Moogu (Nose of Shiva) or Shivana-Mogge (Flowers to be offered to Shiva) can be the origins of the name "Shivamogga". Another legend indicates that the name Shimoga is derived from the word Sihi-Moge which means sweet pot. According to this legend, Shivamogga once had the ashram of the sage Durvasa. He used to boil sweet herbs in an earthen pot. Some cowherds, found this pot and after tasting the sweet beverage named this place Sihi-Moge.

== History ==
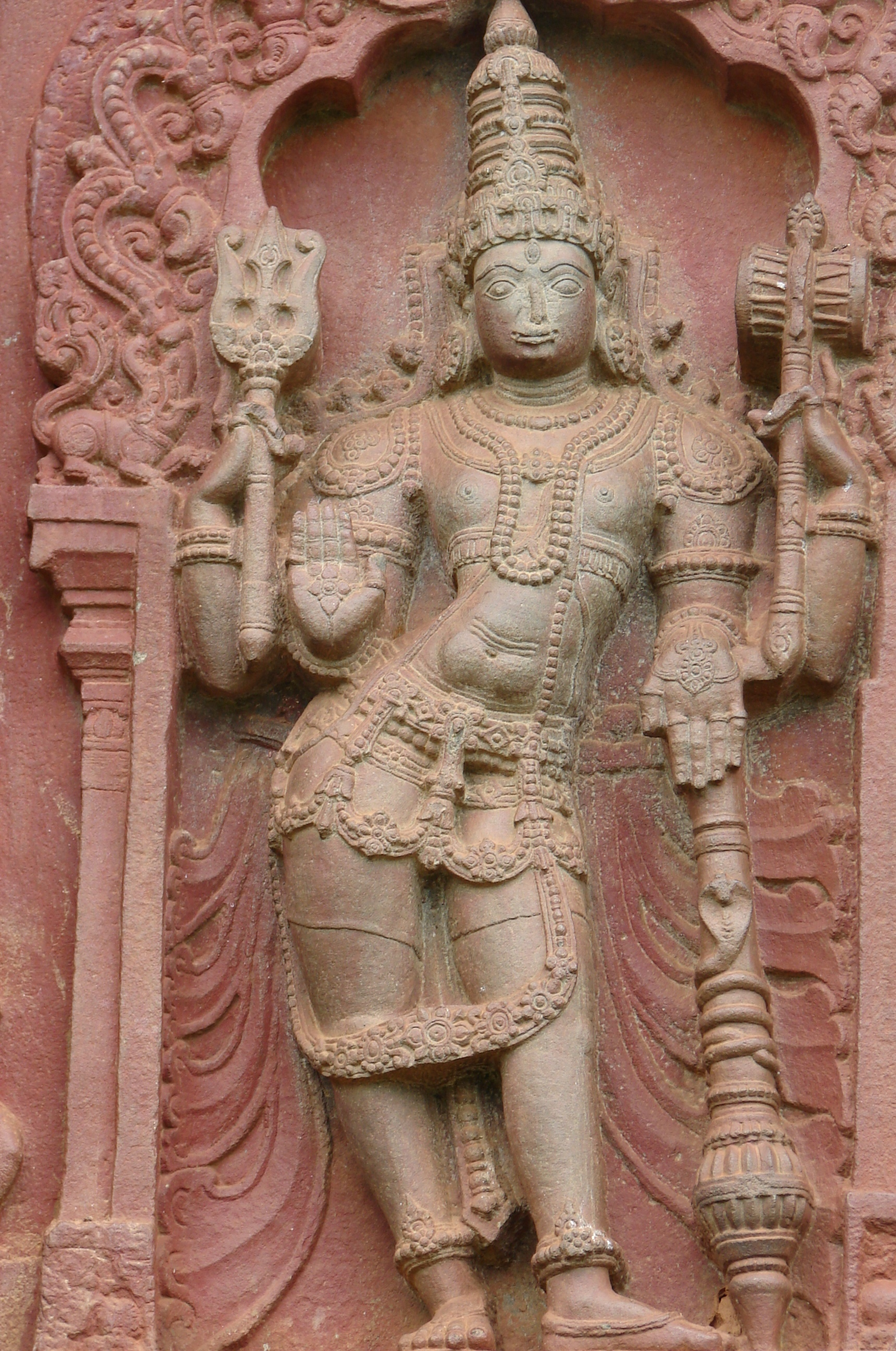
Outer wall carving, Aghoreshwara temple, Ikkeri, Sagar taluk Shimoga District.

During Treta Yuga, it is believed that Lord Rama killed Maricha, who was in the disguise of a deer at Mrugavadhe near Thirthahalli. The Shimoga region formed a part of the Mauryan empire during the 3rd century. The district came into the control of Satavahanas. The Satakarni inscription has been found in the Shikaripur taluk. After the fall of the Shatavahana empire around 200 CE, the area came under the control of the Kadambas of Banavasi around 345 CE. The Kadambas were the earliest kingdom to give administrative status to the Kannada language. Later the Kadambas became feudatories of the Badami Chalukyas around 540 CE.

In the 8th century Rashtrakutas ruled this district. The Kalyani Chalukyas overthrew the Rashtrakutas, and the district came into their rule. Balligavi was a prominent city during their rule. In the 12th century, with the weakening of the Kalyani Chalukyas, the Hoysalas annexed this area. After the fall of the Hoysalas, the entire region came under the Vijayanagar Empire. When the Vijayanagar empire was defeated in 1565 CE in the battle of Tallikota, the Keladi Nayakas who were originally feudatory of the Vijayanagar empire took control, declared sovereignty, and ruled as an independent kingdom for about two centuries. In 1763 Haider Ali captured the capital of Keladi Nayakas and as a result the district came into the rule of the Kingdom of Mysore and remained a part of it until India acquired independence from the British.

== Geography ==
Shimoga district is a part of the Malnad region of Karnataka and is also known as the 'Gateway to Malnad' or 'Malenaada Hebbagilu' in Kannada. The district is landlocked and bounded by Haveri, Davanagere, Chikmagalur, Udupi and Uttara Kannada districts. The district ranks 9th in terms of the total area among the districts of Karnataka. It is spread over an area of 8465 km^{2}.

Shimoga lies between the latitudes 13°27' and 14°39' N and between the longitudes 74°38' and 76°04' E at a mean altitude of 640 metres above sea level. The peak Kodachadri hill at an altitude of 1343 metres above sea level is the highest point in this district. Dozens Rivers flow in district few are originated are Dandavati River, Varahi River, Varada formed Kunchikal Falls, Sharavati formed Jog falls, and Chakra River have constructed two spectacular dam Chakra and Savehaklu Reservoir. The two major rivers that flow through this district are Tunga and Bhadra which meet at Koodli near Shimoga city to gain the name of Tungabhadra, which later joins River Krishna. Seetha River flows in western ghat of Shivamogga formed Barkana Falls near Agumbe.

=== Climate ===
As the district lies in the tropical region, rainy season occurs from June to October. In the years 1901–1970, Shimoga received an average annual rainfall of 1813.9 mm with an average of 86 days in the year being rainy days. The average annual temperature of Shimoga district is around 26 °C. The average temperature has increased substantially over the years. In some regions of the district, the day temperature can reach 40 °C during summer. This has led to water crisis and other problems.

=== Geology ===
- The major soil forms found in the Shimoga district are red gravelly clay soil; red clay soil; lateritic gravelly clay soil; lateritic clay soil; medium deep black soil; non-saline and saline alluvio-colluvial soil; brown forest soil.
- The major minerals found in the district are limestone; white quartz; kaolin; kyanite; manganese.

The plain land of the district is suitable for agriculture.

== Demographics ==
Historical population
Year	Pop.	±% p.a.
1901	383,007	—
1911	367,303	−0.42%
1921	354,101	−0.37%
1931	364,903	+0.30%
1941	381,059	+0.43%
1951	475,999	+2.25%
1961	763,076	+4.83%
1971	988,744	+2.62%
1981	1,261,582	+2.47%
1991	1,452,259	+1.42%
2001	1,642,545	+1.24%
2011	1,752,753	+0.65%

Religion in Shimoga district (2011)
Religion	Percent
Hinduism	84.41%
Islam	13.39%
Christianity	1.51%
Jainism	0.53%
Other or not stated	0.16%

According to the 2011 census Shimoga district has a population of 1,752,753, which is roughly equal to population of the nation Gambia and the state of Nebraska of the United States. The district ranks 275th in India out of a total of 640 districts. The district has a population density of 207 inhabitants per square kilometre (540/sq mi). Its population growth rate over the decade 2001–2011 was 6.88%. Shimoga has a sex ratio of 995 females per 1000 males and a literacy rate of 80.5%. 35.59% of the population lives in urban areas. Scheduled Castes and Scheduled Tribes make up 17.58% and 3.73% of the population respectively.

Shimoga taluk has the highest population with Hosanagara taluk having the lowest. The district has a sex ratio of 977 females to 1000 males. Shimoga Taluk having 991 females to 1000 males has the lowest sex-ratio.

Taluk population (2011)
Taluk name	Number of households	Population	Males	Females
Soraba	37,363	185,572	94,267	91,305
Shimoga	93,426	445,192	226,928	218,264
Bhadravati	71,771	338,989	171,917	167,072
Hosanagara	23,358	115,000	57,392	57,608
Sagara	41,915	300,995	150,977	150,018
Shikaripura	41,389	213,590	108,344	105,246
Thirthahalli	32,002	143,207	70,734	72,473

Languages in Shimoga district (2011)
1. Kannada (70.2%)
2. Urdu (12.7%)
3. Tamil (4.17%)
4. Telugu (4.07%)
5. Lambadi (2.95%)
6. Marathi (2.10%)
7. Konkani (1.47%)
8. Others (2.33%)

At the time of the 2011 census, 70.20% of the population spoke Kannada, 12.71% Urdu, 4.17% Tamil, 4.07% Telugu, 2.95% Lambadi, 2.10% Marathi and 1.47% Konkani as their first language.

== Administrative divisions ==
Shimoga district is divided into seven taluks: Soraba, Bhadravathi, Thirthahalli, Sagara, Shikaripura, Shimoga and Hosanagara.

The district administration is headed by the deputy commissioner who has the additional role of a district magistrate. Assistant commissioners, tahsildars, shirastedars, revenue inspectors and village accountants help the deputy commissioner in the administration of the district. The headquarters is Shimoga city.

The Shimoga Lok Sabha constituency comprises the entire Shimoga district and also covers parts of Nalluru and Ubrani hoblis of Channagiri taluk of Davanagere district. As of 2005 it had 1,286,181 voters: Scheduled Castes and Scheduled Tribes account for 2.2 lakhs; Lingayats account for two lakhs; Deevaru (Idiga) account for 1.8 lakh; (Madivala) account for 1.2 lakh; Muslims account for 1.6 lakh; Brahmins and Vokkaligas account for 1.25 lakh each. Seven members are elected to the Legislative assembly of the state of Karnataka. The assembly constituencies in Shimoga district are:

- Soraba
- Sagara
- Shimoga
- Shimoga Rural
- Shikaripura
- Bhadravathi
- Thirthahalli

=== Partition movements ===
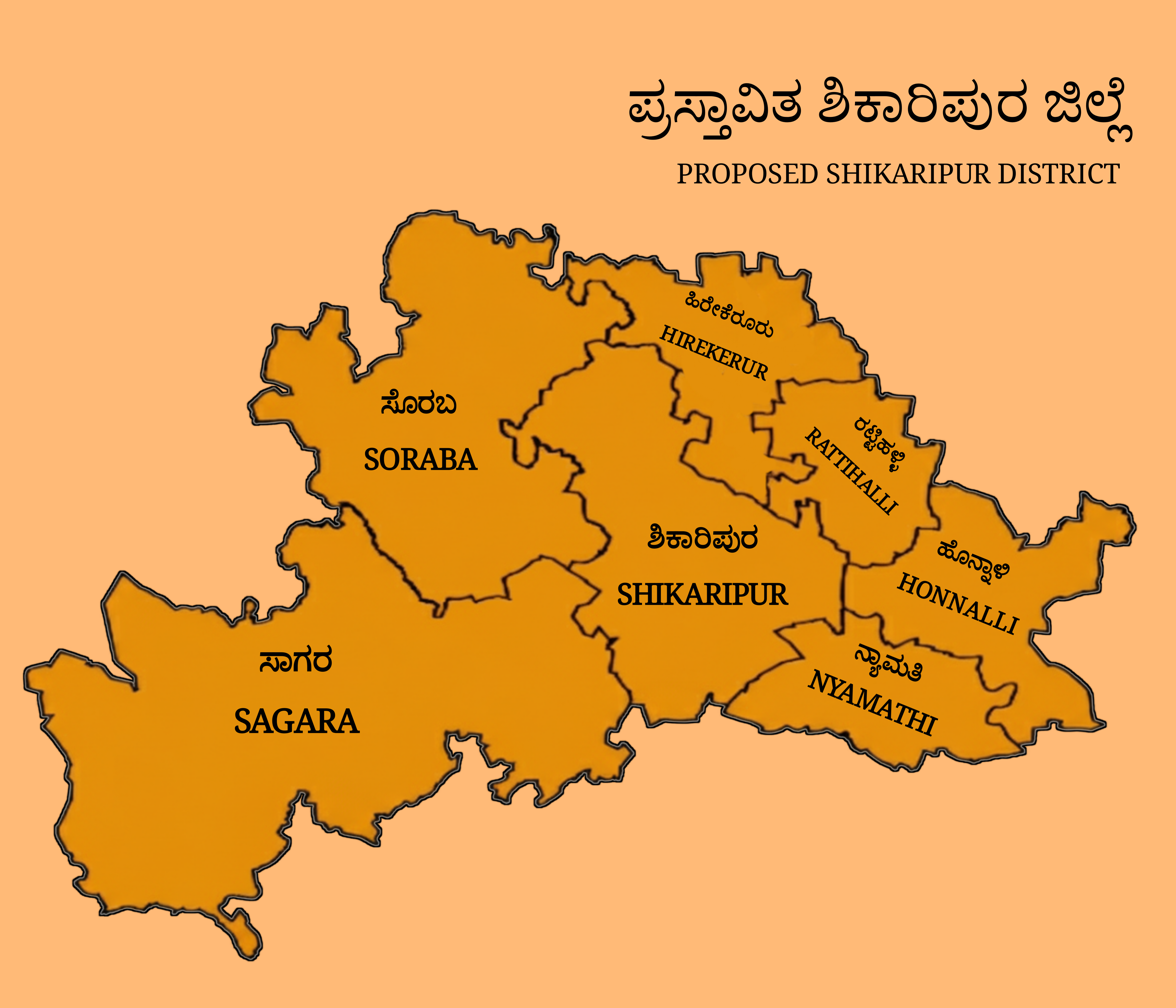
Proposed Shikaripur district

The separate district movements for Shikaripur and Sagara represent a significant political and administrative debate within the current Shimoga District in Karnataka. The movement to carve out a new district with Shikaripur as the headquarters is deeply rooted in the political influence of former Chief Minister B. S. Yediyurappa, whose home constituency is Shikaripur. Proponents of this demand, which dates back over a decade and was revived around 2019, have highlighted the town's existing infrastructure and connectivity as suitable for a district centre. The proposed Shikaripur district would typically include taluks such as Soraba from Shimoga, along with areas like Honnali and Nyamathi from neighboring districts.

In direct counter to the Shikaripur proposal, the town of Sagara has intensified its own demand to be declared the new district headquarters, primarily organized under the banner of the Sagara Zilla Horata Samiti (Sagara District Struggle Committee). Sagara's proponents argue that, Sagara is already a subdivision headquarters and larger town then Shikaripur. This dual movement is often characterised as a rivalry between the two politically significant towns, with Sagara activists directly countering the Shikaripur demand. Despite the persistent nature of both movements, a lack of cohesive support from the surrounding taluks and a clear commitment from the state government has meant that neither proposal has officially progressed towards the bifurcation of Shimoga district.

== Economy ==
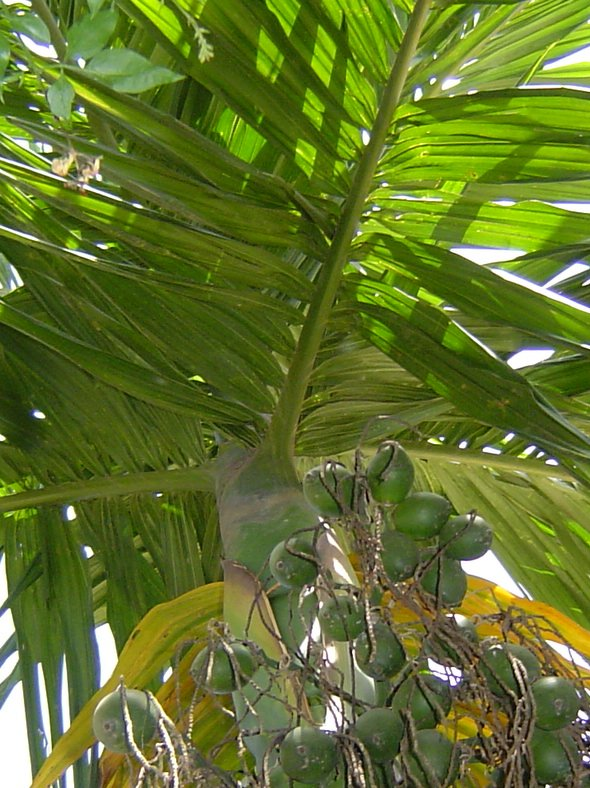
Cornerstone of the Shimoga district's agrarian economy: the arecanut.

Foundry, agriculture and animal husbandry are the major contributors to the economy of Shimoga district. The crops cultivated in this district are paddy, arecanut, cotton, maize, oil seeds, cashewnut, pepper, chili, ginger, Ragi. Karnataka is the largest producer of arecanut in India, the majority of which is cultivated in the Shimoga district. The farmers have cultivated crops like Vanilla and Jatropha that has yielded high monetary benefits. Spices like, clove, pepper, cinnamon, cardamom are grown along with areaca plants. This multi cropping can help in maximum utilisation of land space and improve soil fertility. As spices have high commercial value it provides additional income to farmers.

=== Industries ===
Iron, agriculture, Textiles and engineering are the major industries in Shimoga district. Foundry activity has a long history there and Pearlite Liners (P) Led., one of the oldest industries of Karnataka (earlier known as Bharath Foundry), is the largest private-sector employer in the district. As of 2000, there were about 9800 industrial units in Shimoga District (small, medium and large), with more than 41,000 employees.

Major investments are made in food; beverages, engineering, and mechanical goods. Other rural industries in this district are carpentry, blacksmith, leather, pottery, beekeeping, stone cutting, handlooms, agarbathi, and sandalwood carving.

Karnataka government has created industrial regions to encourage industrialisation of the district: KIADB Nidige Industrial area in Bhadravathi taluk; Machinahaali Industrial Area. Mandli-Kallur Industrial area in Shimoga taluk; Shimoga Industrial estate in Shimoga; Kallahalli Industrial estate in Shimoga. KIADB Devakathikoppa Industrial Area. KSSIDC Siddlipura Industrial Area. Major industries in Shimoga district are VISL and MPM.

== Culture ==
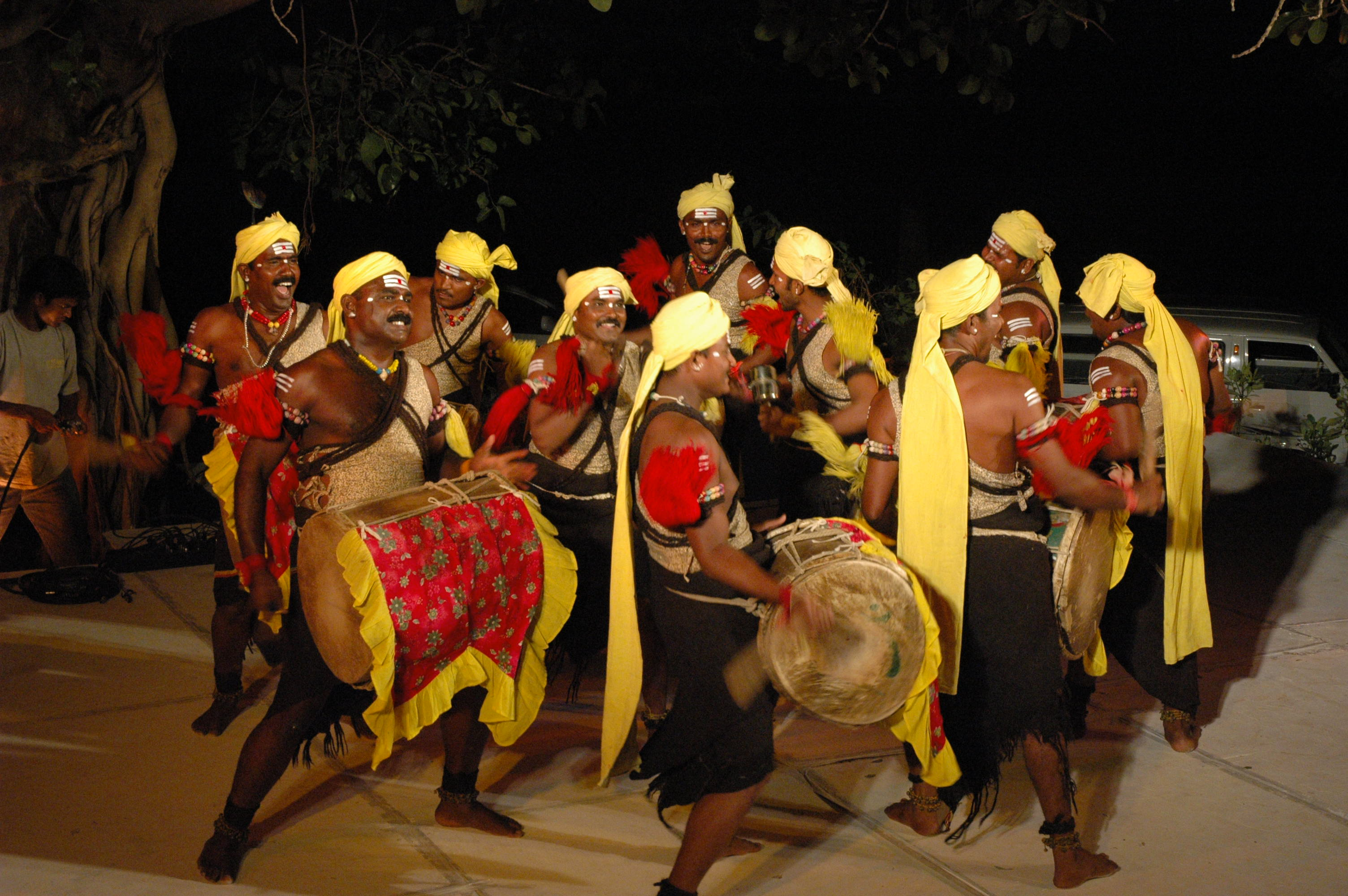
Dollu Kunitha performance at the Fireflies Festival of Sacred Music.

=== Heritage and architecture ===
Ballegavi, also known as 'Dakshina kedara', was the capital of Banavasi rulers during the 12th century CE. There are many temples in Ballegavi, some constructed as per Late Chalukyan architecture: Kedareshvara temple, Tripurantakeshvara temple, and Prabhudeva temple. They are known for architecture and sculpture. Shivappa Naik palace is located in Shimoga on the banks of river Tunga; it was constructed by Shivappa nayaka of Keladi. The Lakshminarsimha temple in Bhadravathi was built as per Hoysala architecture. Keladi and Ikkeri were the capital cities during the time of Keladi Nayakas. There are three temples in Keldai: Rameshvara temple, Veerbhadreshvara temple, and Parvati temple. The Aghoreshvara temple is in Ikkeri. The Sacred Heart church, constructed in the 1990s, is second largest church of Asia.

=== Poetry and literature ===
Shimoga district has produced several Kannada writers and poets:

- Kuvempu was born in the village Kuppalli in Thirthahalli Taluk.
- G. S. Shivarudrappa born in Shikaripur.
- U.R. Ananthamurthy was born in Melige village in Thirthahalli Taluk.
- P. Lankesh born in Konagavalli.
- K. V. Subbanna from Sagara
- M. K. Indira
- Na D'Souza from Sagara
- H. M. Nayak from Thirthahalli
- Poornachandra Tejaswi, the son of Kuvempu.

In December 2006, the 73rd Kannada Sahitya Sammelana took place in Shimoga. K.S.Nissar Ahmed was the president of the event. This was the third Kannada Sahiya Sammelana held at Shimoga: The first one was held in 1946 (president: Da.Ra.Bendre) and second one in 1976 (president: S.V.Ranganna).

=== Ninasam ===
Nilakanteshwara Natya Seva Sangha is located in a village called Heggodu in Sagara. It was established by K. V. Subbanna in 1958. Ninasam is a drama institute. The headquarters is in Heggodu. It has a library, rehearsal hall, guesthouse and theatre. Shivarama Karantha Rangamandira is an auditorium for Ninasam. It was opened in 1972. Ninasam started a Theatre-in-education project called Shalaranga with the help from the government of India during 1991–1993. Ford Foundation has volunteered in establishing a rural theatre and film culture project called Janaspandana. Ninasam conducts a summer workshop for youngsters. Ninasam chitrasamaja is an organisation to encourage film culture and to hold film festivals.

=== Handicrafts and sculpture ===
Gudigars are a clan of craftsmen who are specialised in carving intricate designs on wood, mainly sandalwood. They are concentrated in the Sagara and Soraba taluks. The articles they make are sold at government emporiums. Ashok Gudigar is one of the sculptors from this clan. A 41-foot Bahubali statue is one of his works. He has won the Vishwakarma award for his Chalukyan-style Ganesha sculpture. He has won the National award in 1992 for his Hoysala-styled Venugopala sculpture.

=== Dance ===
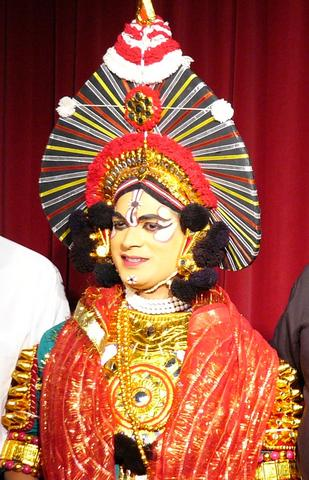
A Yakshagana artist.

Dollu Kunitha and Yakshagana are some of the dance forms which are prevalent in this district. Yakshagana has a long history in the district and Dr. Kota Shivarama Karantha suggests that origin of the 'badaguthittu' form of Yakshagana took place in the region between Ikkeri of Shimoga district and Udupi.

=== Fairs ===
Dasara is celebrated every year in Shimoga. Many cultural programmes are held during this time. A folk fair was organised in Shimoga in 2006. Marikamba festival is celebrated in Sagara once in 3 years.

=== Cinema ===
The tele-serial Malgudi days which was based on a novel written by R K Narayan was shot in Agumbe. It was directed by the Kannada actor and director Shankar Nag. The film Kanoora heggadathi which was based on the novel written by Kuvempu was shot in Thirthahalli taluk. It was directed by Girish Karnad. B. V. Karanth composed music for this film. The film Samskara, based on the novel written by U. R. Anantha Murthy, was shot in a village in the Shimoga district.

Cinema personalities born in Shimoga district:

- Girish Kasaravalli: Film director who has won several Swarna Kamal awards for Kannada art movies.
- P. Lankesh: Editor of the tabloid Lankesh Patrike and director of a few films.
- Ashok Pai: Psychiatrist, script writer and film producer who produced Kannada film Kadina Benki and others.
- Sudeep: Kannada actor born in Shimoga
- Arun Sagar: A Kannada Actor from Sagara

=== Cuisine ===
Rice is the staple food for majority of the people in Shimoga district. The food in this district is somewhat similar to Udupi cuisine. However, exclusive dishes specified to Malenadu are a part of Shimoga District.

The cooking in the Malnad region of Shimoga district includes items like midigayi-uppinakai (tender-mango pickle), sandige (similar to pappadum), avalakki (beaten rice) and akki rotti. Havyaka people have their own cuisine consisting of such varied items like genesale (sweet made of jaggery, rice and coconut), thotadevvu (sweet made of rice and sugarcane juice) and thambli (a curd preparation containing other ingredients like ginger, turmeric root, jasmine and rose sprouts).

== Flora and fauna ==
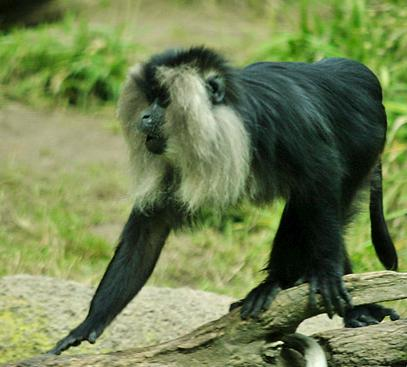
Lion-tailed macaque, endemic to the Western Ghats and found in the Malnad region of Shimoga district.

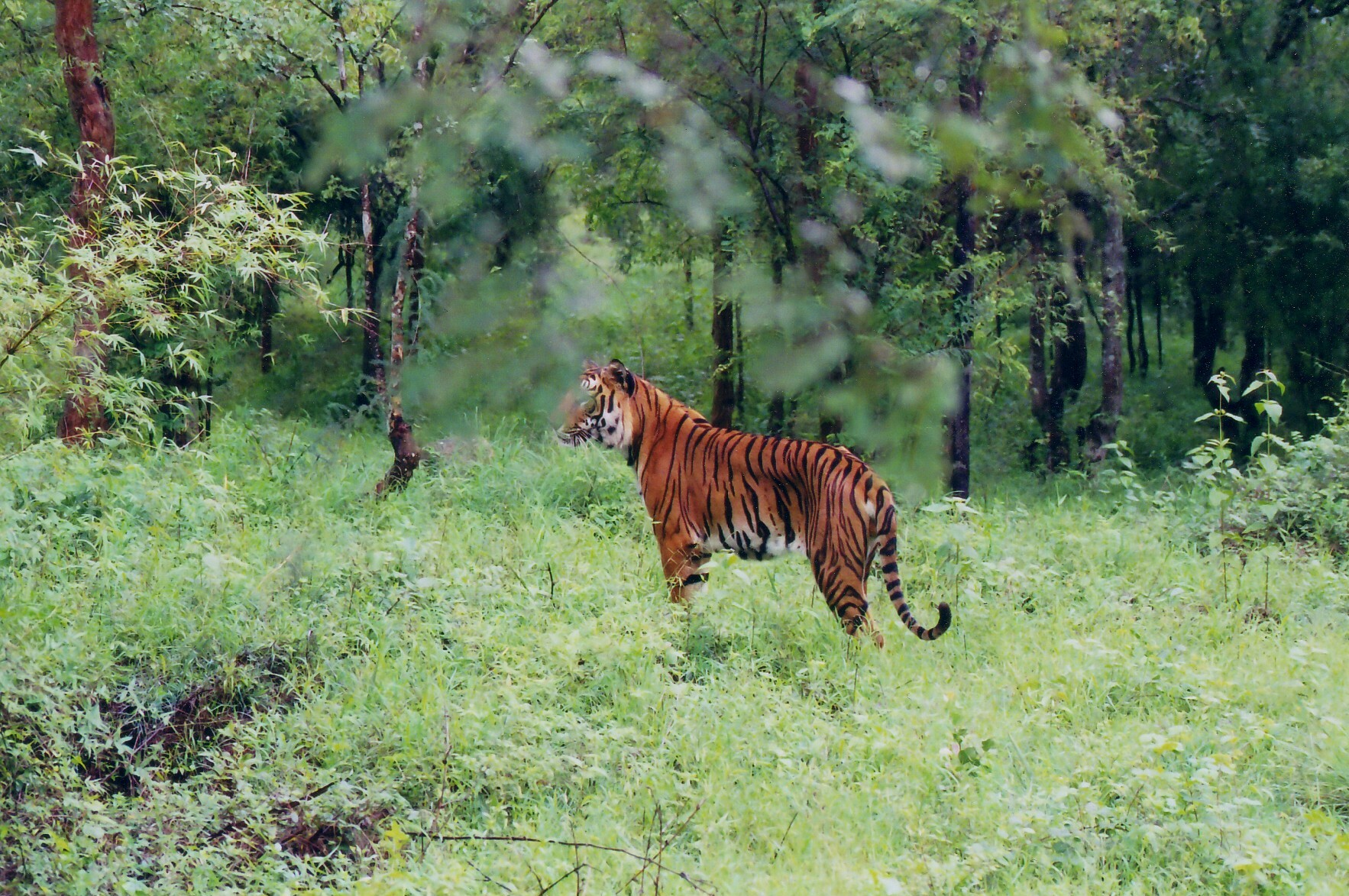
Tiger at Bhadra Wildlife Sanctuary

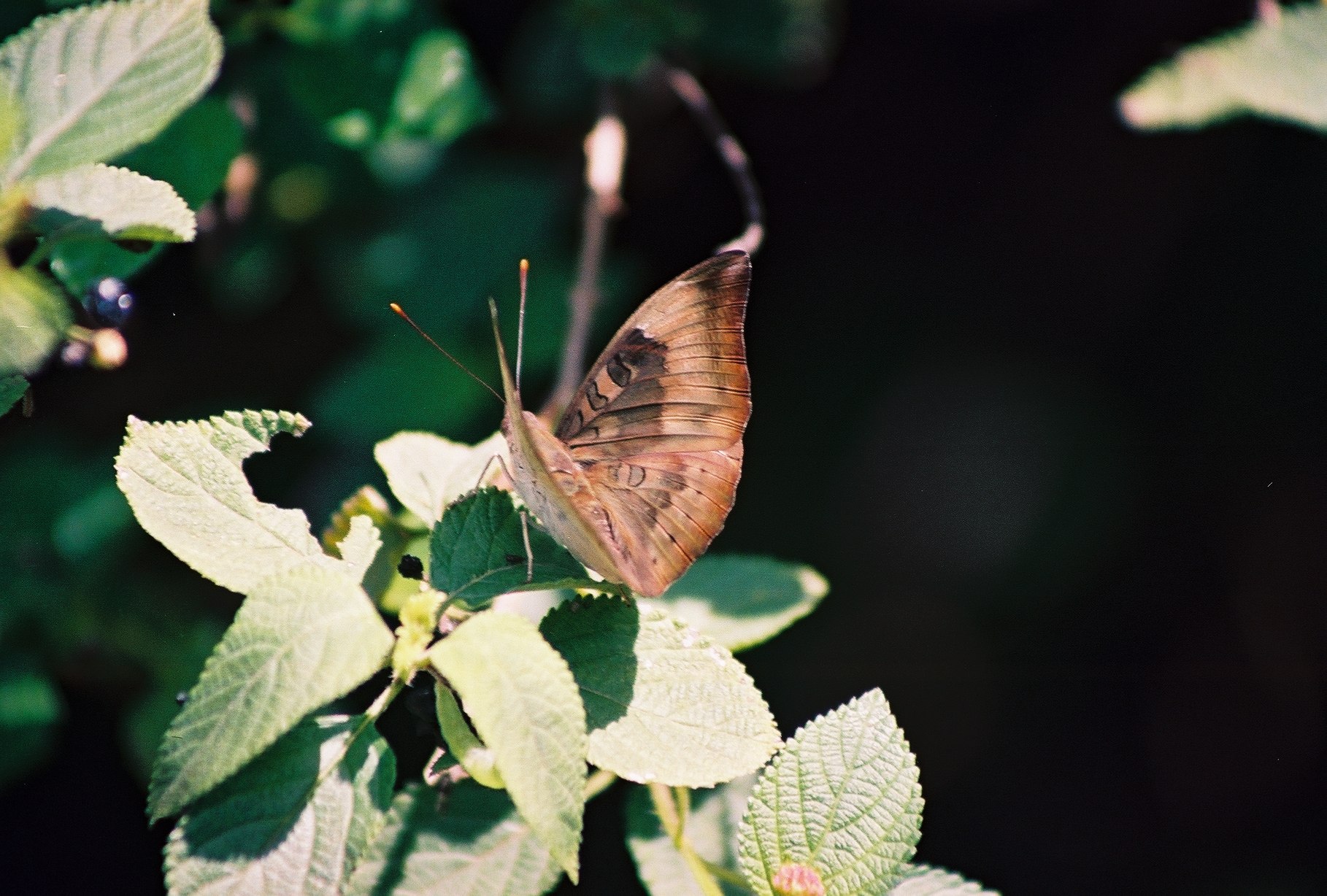
Common baron butterflies in the Bhadra Wildlife Sanctuary

The Malnad region is a biodiversity hotspot with a rich diversity of flora and fauna. The region has protected areas classified as wildlife sanctuaries to ensure the protection of these species:

- Gudavi Bird Sanctuary is in Sorab Taluk. The sanctuary is spread over an area of 0.74 km^{2} (180 acres)
  - There are many species of flora found here: Vitex leucoxylon, Phyllanthus polyphyllus, Terminalia bellerica, Terminalia paniculata, Terminalia chebula, Lagerstroemia lanceolata, Dalbergia latifolia, Haldina cordifolia, Xylia xylocarpa, Caryota urens, Ficus benghalensis, Ficus religiosa, Butea monosperma, Santalum album, Diospyros melanoxylon; Madhuca longifolia, Kirganelia reticulata.
  - 191 species of fauna have been recorded here: 63 are water-dependent; 20 species are known to breed here. Water birds in the sanctuary include black-headed ibis, Darters, Little Cormorant, Indian shag, Cattle Egret, Little Egret, Large Egret, Spoonbill, Grey Heron, purple heron, Pond Heron, night heron, Coot, Pheasant-tailed Jacana, Purple Swamphen, Common Sandpiper, Little ringed plover, Little Grebe, Cotton Teal. An average of about 8000 White Ibis visit the sanctuary every year.
- Sharavathi Valley Wildlife Sanctuary is in Sagar Taluk. It has evergreen and semi-evergreen forests with its eastern portion adjoining the Linganamakki reservoir.
  - The species of flora found here: Dipterocarpus indicus, Calophyllum tomentosum, Persea macrantha, Caryota urens, Aporosa lindleyana, Calycopteris floribunda, Entada scandens, Acacia concinna, Gnetum scandens. In the semi-evergreen and moist deciduous forests, common species include: Lagerstroemia microcarpa, Hopea parviflora, Dalbergia latifolia, Dillenia pentagyna, Careya arborea, Emblica officinalis, Randia, Terminalia, Vitex altissima.
  - The animals found here: gaurs, Lion-tailed Macaque, Tiger, leopard (black panther), Wild Dog, jackal, Sloth Bear, Spotted Deer, sambar deer, barking deer, Mouse Deer, Wild Boar, common langur, bonnet macaque, Malabar giant squirrel, giant flying squirrel, Porcupine, Otters; Pangolins. Reptiles include King Cobra, python, rat snake, Crocodile, Monitor Lizard. Avian species found here: three species of hornbills; Asian paradise flycatcher; Racket-tailed Drongo; lories and lorikeets.
- Shettihalli Wildlife Sanctuary lies adjacent to Shimoga city and has forests ranging from dry deciduous to semi-evergreen and is spread over an area of 395.6 km^{2} (152.7 sq mi). Large areas of forests have been destroyed due to fire.
  - Trees of the dry deciduous parts include Terminalia tomentosa, Terminalia bellerica, Gmelina arborea, Tectona grandis, Anogeissus latifolia, Lagerstroemia lanceolata, Wrightia tinctoria, Cassia fistula; and Emblica officinalis. In the moist deciduous forest species like Adina cordifolia, Xylia xylocarpa, Grewia tilaefolia, Kydia calycina, bamboo Dendrocalamus strictus, Bambusa arundinacea. The semi-evergreen forests are represented by Dipterocarpus, Michelia, Hopea, Schleichera, and Bambusa. Plants like Acacia auriculiformis, Tectona grandis, and Grevillea robusta also exist in the sanctuary.
  - Mammals in the sanctuary include Tigers, Leopards, Wild Dogs, Jackals, Gaurs, Elephants; Sloth Bears, Sambar Deer, Spotted Deer, Wild Boar, Common Langurs; Bonnet macaques, Common Mongoose, Striped-necked Mongoose, Porcupine, Malabar giant squirrel, giant flying squirrel, Pangolin.

Python, cobra, king cobra, rat snake, marsh crocodile are among the reptiles found in the sanctuary.

Birds include Hornbills, Kingfishers, Bulbuls, Parakeets, Doves, Pigeons, babblers, Flycatchers, munias, Swallows, Woodpeckers, Peafowl, Jungle fowl, Partridges. A tiger and lion safari at Tyavarekoppa was created in the northeastern part of the sanctuary in 1988.

- Bhadra Wildlife Sanctuary was started in 1951 as Jagara valley game sanctuary covering an area of about 252 km^{2} (97 sq mi). It was combined with the surrounding Lakkavalli forests in 1972 and given its present name of Bhadra Wildlife Sanctuary. It now spans an area of 492 km^{2} (190 sq mi). Some of the wild animals found in this sanctuary are Tiger, Leopard, Wild Dog, Jackal, Elephant, Gaur, Sloth Bear, Sambar Deer, Spotted Deer, Monitor Lizard, Barking Deer, Wild Boar, Common Langur, bonnet macaque, Slender Loris, the Malabar giant squirrel.

Some of the bird species found here are Malabar whistling thrush; species of Bulbuls; Woodpeckers, Hornbills, pigeons, Drongos, Asian paradise flycatcher. The sanctuary has been recently adopted under a tiger-conservation project called Project Tiger which is an initiative from the Indian government.

- Mandagadde Bird Sanctuary is a 1.14-acre (0.46 ha) sanctuary 30 kilometres (19 mi) from Shimoga town on the way to Thirthahalli. This is a small island surrounded by Tunga river. The birds found here are median egret, cormorant, darter, snakebird.
- Sakrebailu Elephant Camp lies 14 km. from Shimoga town on the way to Thirthahalli. This is a training camp where elephants undergo training from mahouts.
- Tyavarekoppa Lion and Tiger Safari lies about 10 km (6.2 mi) from Shimoga town on the way to Sagar. The safari has lions, tigers and deer.

== Education ==
Shimoga district has a literacy rate of 80.2%. The district has two engineering colleges, two medical colleges, an ayurvedic medical college, dental college, veterinary College and an agricultural college. There are 116 pre-university colleges in the district out of which 51 government pre-university colleges. There are 41 educational institutions managed by National education society. There are 1106 lower primary schools and 1185 higher primary schools.

=== Primary and high school education ===
There are 1106 lower primary schools, 1185 higher primary schools and 393 high schools in Shimoga district. There are 1323 anganawadis. National education society has 31 educational institutions including pre-university and first grade colleges. There are five CBSE schools,

=== Pre-university education ===
There are 116 pre-university colleges in the district. There are 51 government colleges, 3 bifurcated colleges, 47 unaided colleges and 15 aided colleges. In the 2012 second year pre-university examination, the district ranked 5th with 54.31% of passed candidates.

=== Diploma courses ===
There are 8 Polytechnics in the district. Major polytechnics among them are Government Polytechnic - Bhadravathi, Government Women's Polytechnic - Gopala, Sahyadri Polytechnic, Sanjay Memorial Polytechnic-Sagara, DVS Polytechnic.

=== Undergraduate education ===
There are 12 colleges affiliated to Kuvempu University, 5 B.Ed and B.P.Ed colleges and 3 constituent colleges. Sahyadri science college is located in Shimoga city. It was established in 1940 and was upgraded to first grade college in 1956. It offers two undergraduate courses: BSc and B.C.A. There are two engineering colleges in the district: Jawaharlal Nehru national college of engineering and P.E.S. Institute of Technology and Management. Jawaharlal Nehru national college of engineering was established in 1980 by the National education society. The college offers 7 courses in B.E. PES institute of technology and management was established in 2007. The college offers 5 undergraduate programmes in B.E. National College of Pharmacy in the center of the city is one of the oldest college in Karnataka state and students across the nation has studied here. Shimoga Institute of Medical Sciences was started in 2005. It is on the premises of the McGann Hospital in Shimoga, established in memory of British Surgeon Dr. T.G.McGann. The college is affiliated to Rajiv Gandhi University of Health Sciences, Karnataka. There are 21 departments in the college. Bapuji Ayurvedic Medical college, established in 1996, is in Shimoga, which offers B.A.M.S. Ayurvedacharya degree. T.M.A.E. Society's Ayurved College, established in 1992, is located in Shimoga, which also offers B.A.M.S Ayuvedacharya degree. Both colleges are affiliated to Rajiv Gandhi University of Health Sciences. Sharavathi Dental college, established in the year 1992, is in Shimoga and has been approved by DCI. It offers B.D.S. in Dental surgery. It is affiliated to Rajiv Gandhi University of Health Sciences.

=== Postgraduate education ===
Sahyadri science college offers two post graduate programmes: M.Sc. and MTA. Jawaharlal Nehru national college of engineering has 7 post-graduate programmes: Master of computer applications; Master of business administration; M.Tech. in Computer Science and Engineering; M.Tech. in Network & Internet Engineering; M.Tech. in Design Engineering; M.Tech. in Transportation Engineering and Management; M.Tech. in Digital Electronics and Communication Systems. PES Shimoga offers post-graduation in business studies, Master of Business Administration. The Kuvempu University offers courses in Languages, Literature and Fine Arts; Social Sciences; Economic and Business studies; Physical Sciences; Chemical sciences; Bio Sciences; Earth and Environmental Science; Law; Education; M.Tech. in Nanoscience and Technology.

== Sports ==
Shimoga district has three cricket stadiums: Nehru stadium, Jawaharlal Nehru college of engineering cricket ground and PES Institute of Technology Cricket ground. The first match played on the Nehru stadium was in 1974. Since then 13 matches have been played out of which 3 are Ranji matches. The Ranji match between Karnataka and Uttar Pradesh was hosted on the Jawaharlal Nehru cricket ground.

Sagara has a cricket stadium called Gopalagowda Stadium. It is a leather pitch stadium in the district.

The work on an international cricket stadium has started near Navule. The VISL cricket stadium is located in Bhadravathi. Shivamogga Lions represents the Shimoga zone in the KPL. Shimoga, Hassan and Chickmagalur districts come under the Shimoga zone in the Karnataka premier league.

Gundappa Viswanath is a cricketer from Bhadravathi. He has played test cricket for India from 1969 to 1983 making 91 appearances. Bharat Chipli is a cricketer from Sagar who plays for Deccan Chargers. The 18th Junior National Athletic Championship was held in Shimoga.

State-level kho kho and volleyball competitions are held in the district. The volleyball tournaments are held on the Kuvempu University campus and Nehru stadium. VTU inter-collegiate cricket, football, volleyball and handball tournaments are held in the districts. The district football team has won inter-district football tournaments. Shimoga was the host for the CBSE National Handball Championship in 2009. City-level basketball tournaments are conducted in Sahyadri College premises. Other sports tournaments held in Shimoga are table tennis; badminton; kabaddi; chess. There are proposals to upgrade the Nehru stadium in Shimoga. The upgraded stadium would contain a swimming pool of international standards, an indoor stadium, basketball court and a synthetic track. There are proposals to build sports stadium at Thirthahalli, Shikaripura and Soraba.

== Tourism ==
=== Waterfalls ===
- Jog Falls is the highest waterfall in India and second highest in Asia. The river Sharavathi falls into the gorge in four distinct flows which are termed Raja, Rani, Roarer, and Rocket. Jog falls is located in the outskirts of Kargal town.
- Kunchikal Falls is the 11th highest waterfall in India and 313th highest in the world with a height of 455 meters and ranks 116 in the list of highest waterfalls in the world. This waterfall is near Mastikatte and is formed by the Varahi River.
- Barkana Falls is near Agumbe and 80 km from Thirthahalli town. Barkana Falls is the 10th highest waterfall in India and ranks 308 in the world.

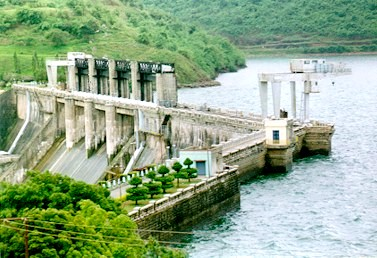
Bhadra river project dam in Bhadravathi.

- Achakanya Falls is located near a village called Aralsuruli, 10 km from Thirthahalli on the way to Hosanagara. The falls is formed by the Sharavathi river.
- Vanake-Abbey Falls is in the heart of Malnad forests, 4 km from Agumbe.
- Hidlamane Falls is near Nittur in Hosanagara Taluk. The only way to reach it is by trekking.
- Dabbe Falls, Sagara is located near Hosagadde in Sagar taluk. On the road from Sagar to Bhatkal, Hosagadde lies about 20 km from the town of Kargal. From Hosagadde a walk of 6–8 km into the forest leads to Dabbe Falls.

=== Dams ===
- Linganamakki dam is built across the Sharavathi river near Kargal town. It is the main feeder reservoir for the Mahatma Gandhi hydro-electric project. It has two power generating units of 27.5 MW. It is the biggest dam in Karnataka of 151.75 Tmcft.

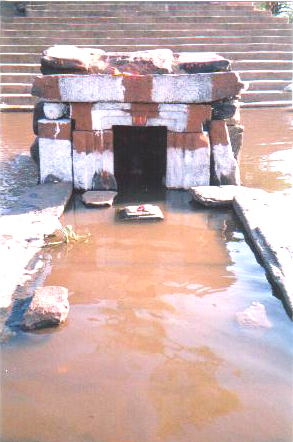
A small temple at Koodli.

- Bhadra river dam is built across Bhadra river at Lakkavalli at distance of 20 km from Bhadravathi city. The dam was constructed by Sir. M. Vishweshwaraiah, the then chief engineer of Karnataka state. The dam mainly serves the purpose of irrigation in and around Bhadravathi taluk and Tarikere taluk of Chikkamagaluru district.
- Gajanur dam is built across the river Tunga in a village called Gajanur 12 km from Shimoga city.

=== Rivers ===
- Tunga and Bhadra originates at Varaha mountains. They meet at Koodli and become Tungabhadra river. Koodli is 16 km from Shimoga city and the Smartha monastery in Koodli was founded in 1576 CE by Jagadguru Narsimha Bharathi swami of Sringeri.
- Ambuteertha is located 10 km from Thirthahalli on the Thirthahalli-Hosanagara road. River Sharavathi originates at this place.
- Varadamoola is 6 km from Sagar town. River Varada originates at this place. Varada flows through the town of Banavasi before joining Tungabhadra.

=== Hill stations ===
- Agumbe is 90 km west of Shimoga city. It is known as the Cherrapunji of South India. Agumbe is 650 meters above sea level. The place is famous for its sunset view.
- Kavaledurga is a fort on a hill 871 metres (2,858 ft) above sea level.
- Kodachadri hills are 115 km from Shimoga city. The hills are 1343 m above sea level.
- Kundadri is a hill near Thirthahalli. It is famous for its rock formations.

=== Cultural heritage ===
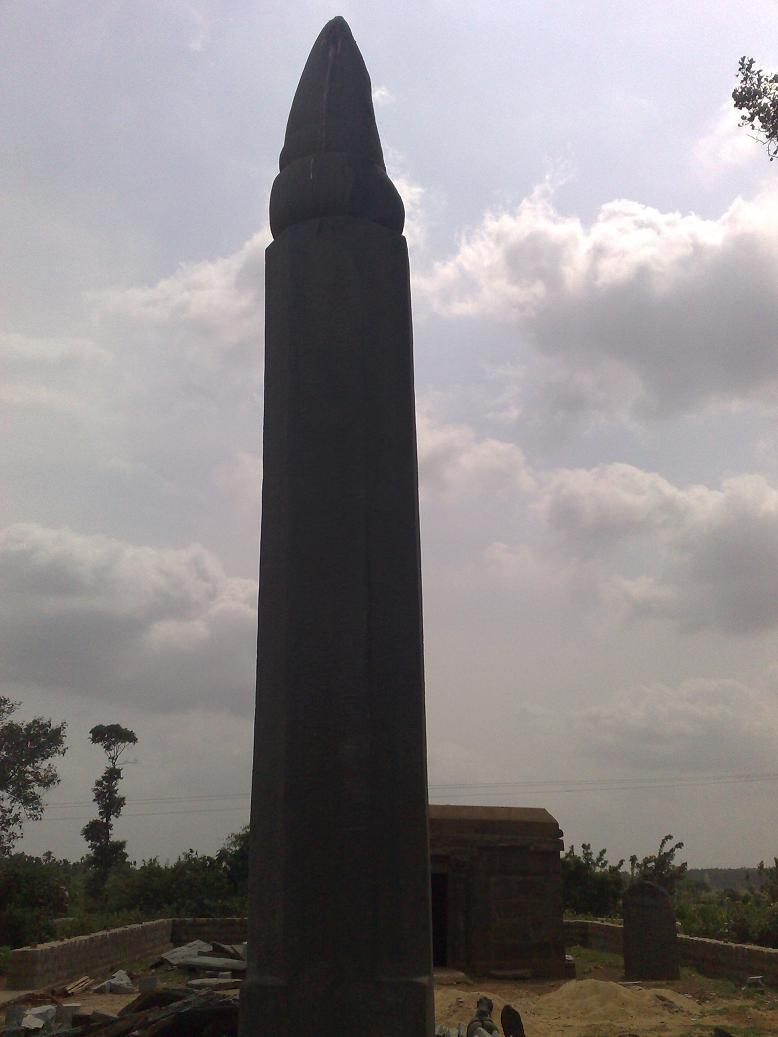
The inscriptions on this rock pillar at Talagunda are written vertically.

- Shivappa Nayaka palace and museum is in the city of Shimoga. The palace was built by Shivappa Nayaka during the 17th century CE. Kote Seetharamanjaneya temple is beside it.
- Sacred Heart church, built in the 1990s and second largest church of Asia, is in the city of Shimoga. It has features of Roman and Ghothic styles of architecture.
- The Lakshminarasimha temple is located in the Bhadravathi city. It has been built in the Hoysala style called 'trikutachala'.
- Chandragutti fort is near Balligavi which was built by Banavasi Kadambas. The Renukamba temple is in this village.
- Humcha is a Jain pilgrimage place with a Panchakuta Basadi, Humcha which was built during 10th and 11th century CE.
- The Kedareshvara temple is located in Kubetoor. It has been built in the Chalukyan style.
- Nagara, which was earlier called Bidarur, was the last capital of the Keladi kings and later taken by Hyder Ali during 1763. The Hyder Ali tank, Neelakanteshwara temple and Venkataramana temple are located in this city.
- Keladi and Ikkeri were the capitals of Keladi Nayakas. The places are near Sagar.
- Talagunda is a village in the Shikaripura taluk. The Talagunda inscription on a stone pillar is in Prakrit language. The author of the inscription was Kubja, court poet of Shantivarman.

== Notable people ==
- U. R. Ananthamurthy, a Jnanapeeta Awardee
- Sarekoppa Bangarappa, an Indian politician who was the 12th Chief Minister of Karnataka from 1990 to 1992
- Diganth, Kannada actor
- Shantaveri Gopala Gowda, a Socialist Leader
- Dattatreya Hosabale, Indian social worker
- M. K. Indira, writer and poet
- Justice M. Rama Jois, a former Chief Justice of the Punjab and Haryana High Court, a former member of Rajya Sabha, a former Governor of Jharkhand and Bihar states and a senior advocate in the Supreme Court of India
- Kaviraj (lyricist), poet, lyricist and director in Kannada film industry
- Kuvempu, a Jnanpeeta Awardee
- P. Lankesh, poet, journalist
- Akka Mahadevi, poet, social reformer
- Kadidal Manjappa, a veteran freedom fighter and a former Chief minister of Karnataka
- Anupama Niranjana, noted writer
- J. H. Patel, former chief minister
- Allama Prabhu, social reformer
- S. Rudregowda, industrialist and Member of Legislative Council
- Khadi Shankarappa, a veteran freedom fighter.
- Abhilash Shetty, a film director in Kannada film industry
- G. S. Shivarudrappa, poet, one of the three Rashtrakavis in Kannada
- K. V. Subbanna, artist and writer
- Shimoga Subbanna, a playback singer
- Sudeep, actor and director of Kannada cinema
- Poornachandra Tejaswi, writer
- Gundappa Viswanath, a former cricketer
- B. S. Yeddyurappa, politician and Chief Minister of Karnataka
