= Shimoga =

City in Karnataka, India

- City
- Shivamogga
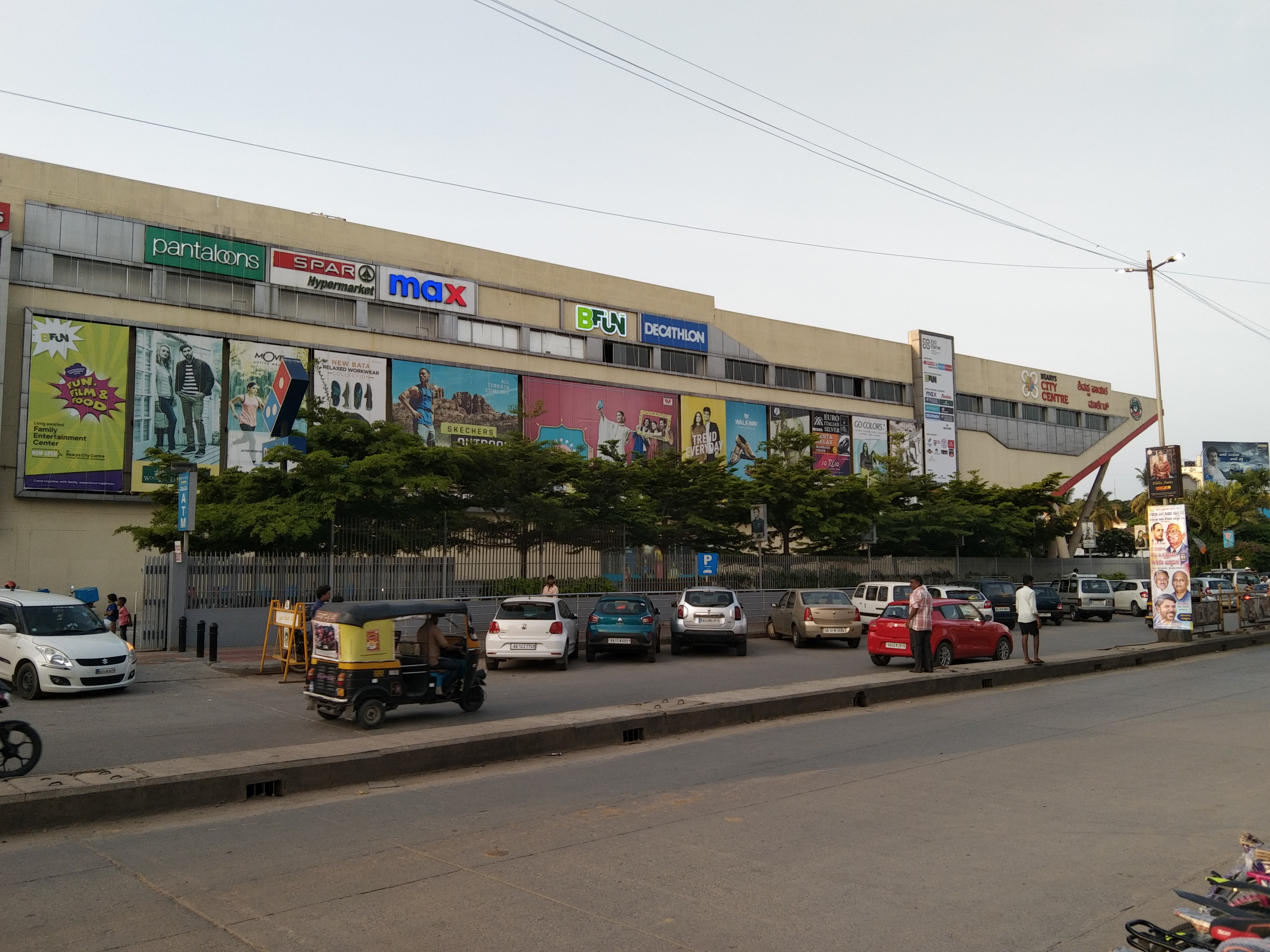
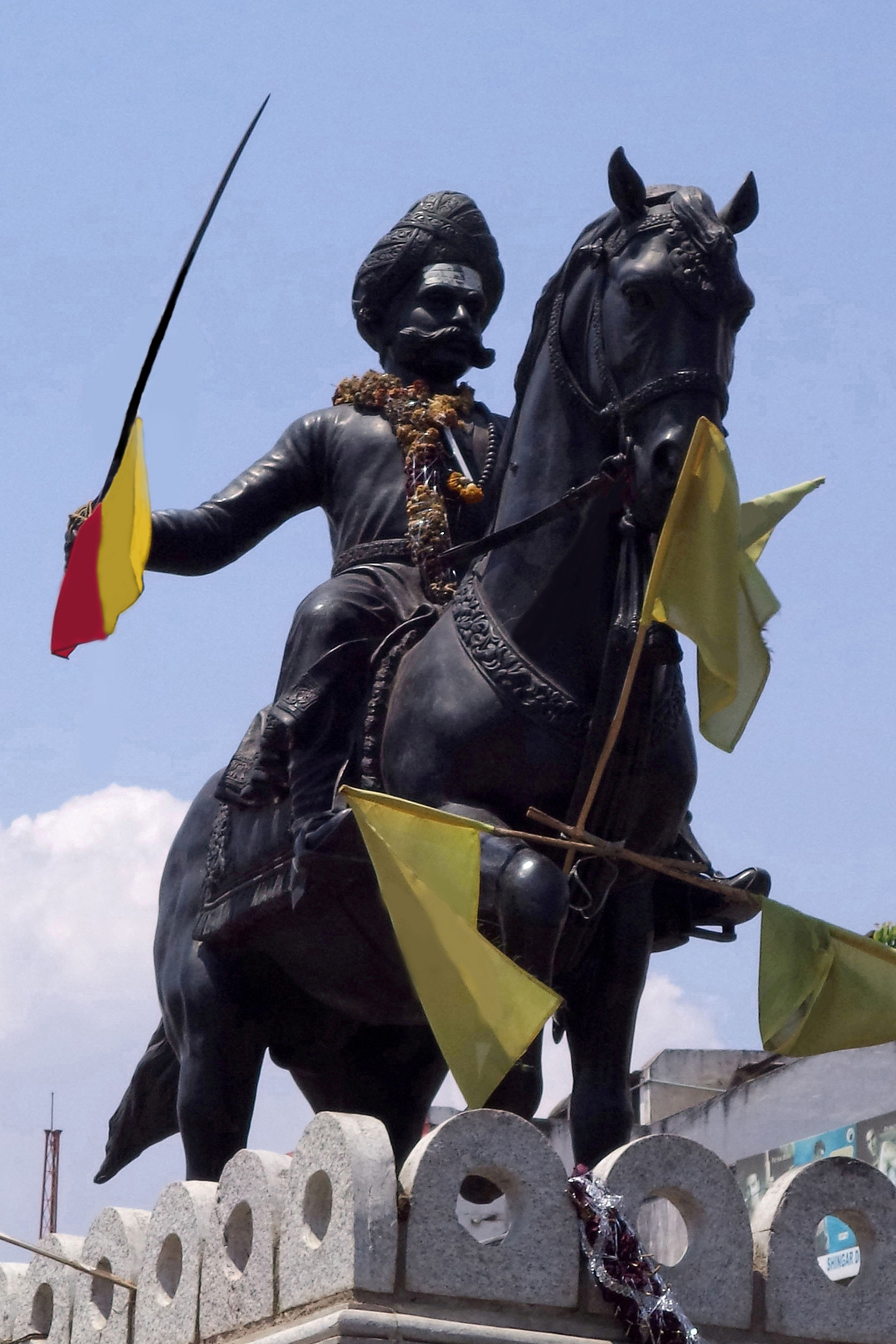
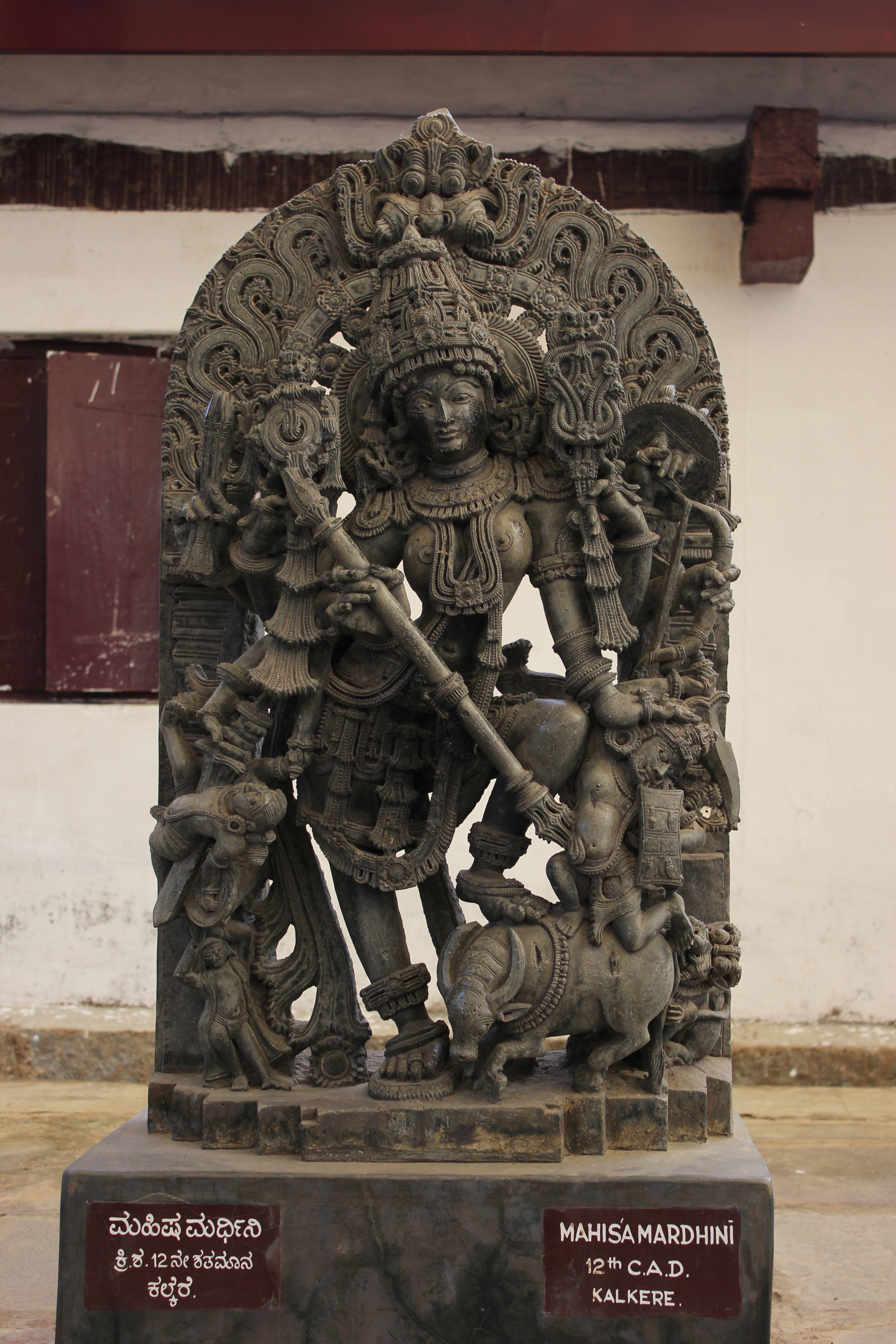
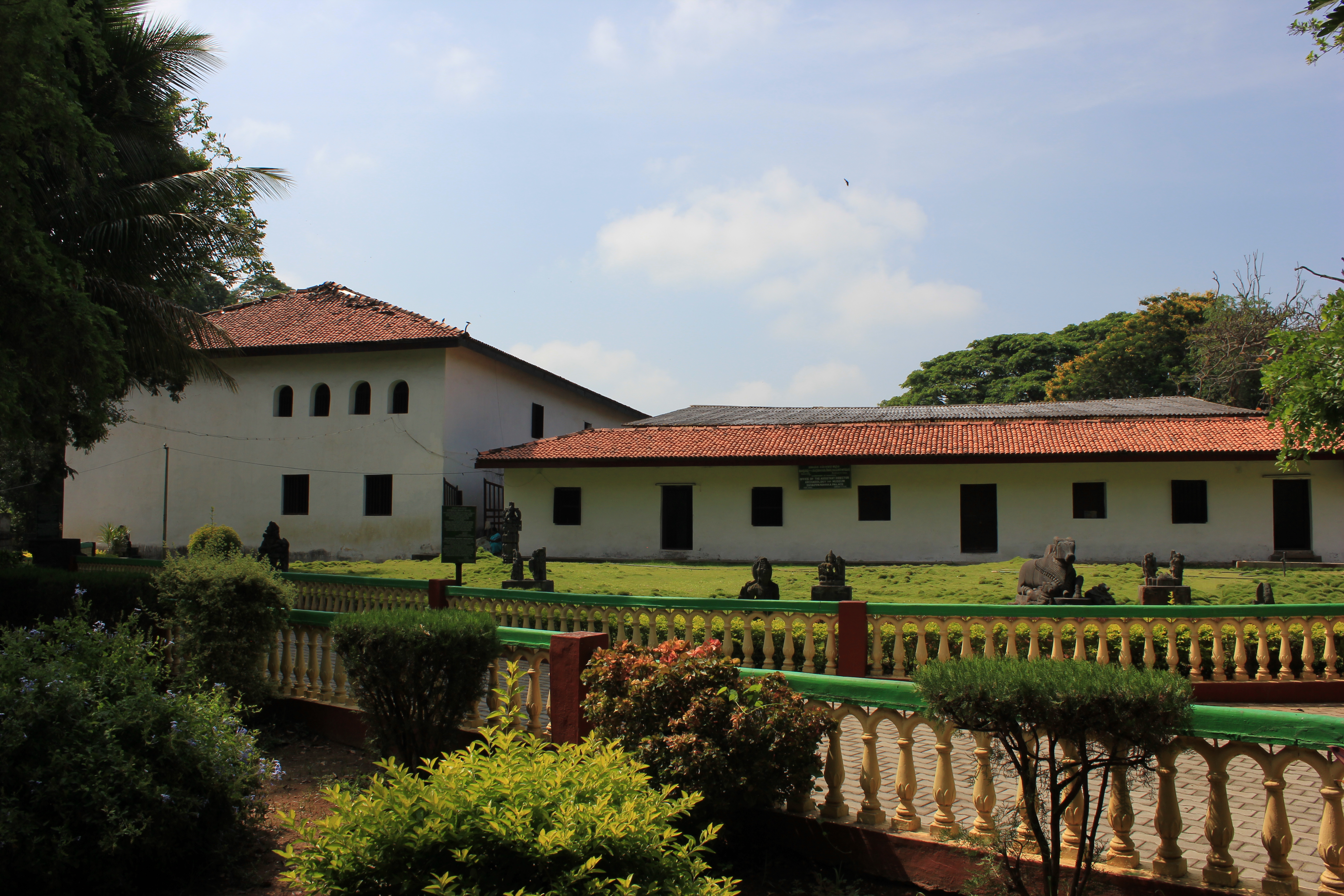
- Images, from top down, left right Indian lion in the Tyavarekoppa Tiger and Lion Reserve; Statue of Keladi Shivappa Nayaka; Sculpture of Mahishasura Mardhini; Shivappa Nayaka palace
- Shivamogga in Karnataka
- Coordinates: 13°56′N 75°34′E
- Country: India
- State: Karnataka
- District: Shimoga
- Region: Malenadu

Government
  - Type: City Corporation
  - Body: Shivamogga City Corporation

Area
  - City: 70.01 km^{2} (27.03 sq mi)
  - Rural: 1,037.29 km^{2} (400.50 sq mi)
- Elevation: 569 m (1,867 ft)

Population (2011)
  - City: 322,650
  - Rank: 10th (Karnataka)
  - Density: 4,609/km^{2} (11,940/sq mi)
  - Rural: 184,674
- Time zone: UTC+5:30 (IST)
- PIN: 577201 - 577205
- Telephone code: 91-(0)8182-XXXXXX
- ISO 3166 code: IN-KA
- Vehicle registration: KA-14
- Official language: Kannada
- Climate: Aw
- Website: shivamoggacitycorp.org

Shimoga, officially Shivamogga (Kannada: [ʃiʋɐmoɡːɐ]), is a city, taluka and the district headquarters of Shimoga district in the Karnataka state of India. The city lies on the banks of the Tunga River. Being the gateway for the hilly region of the Western Ghats, the city is popularly nicknamed the "Gateway to Malnad". The population of Shimoga city is 322,650 as per 2011 census. The city has been selected for the Smart Cities Mission standing in the fourth position in the state and 25th in the country as of November 2020.

The city is 569 m above sea level and is surrounded by lush green paddy fields, arecanut and coconut groves. It is located 267 km from the state capital Bengaluru and 195 km from the port city Mangalore.

== History ==
The name of the city is derived from the term "shivmoga". A version of the etymology is the story that Shiva drank the Tunga River hence the name "Shiva-Mukha" which means the "face of Shiva". Another version of the etymology is that the name is derived from the term Sihi-Mogge, meaning "sweet pot".

The district formed the southern tip of the Emperor Ashoka's Mauryan Empire in the third century BC. It was ruled during later centuries by the Kadambas (4th century), Chalukyas (6th century), Western Ganga, Rashtrakutas (8th century), Hoysalas (11th century), and the Vijayanagara rulers (15th century). Nayakas of Keladi, also known as Nayakas of Bednore and Ikkeri Nayakas, were an Indian dynasty based in Keladi in present-day Shimoga district of Karnataka, India. They were an important ruling dynasty in the late medieval and early modern Karnataka. They initially ruled as a vassal of the famous Vijayanagar Empire. After the fall of the empire in 1565, they gained independence and ruled significant parts of Malnad region of the Western Ghats in present-day Karnataka, most areas in the coastal regions of Karnataka, and parts of northern Kerala, Malabar and the central plains along the Tungabhadra River. . In 1763 AD, with their defeat to Hyder Ali, they were absorbed into the Kingdom of Mysore.

During the Satyagraha movement, Mahatma Gandhi also visited the place to instigate the fight for national freedom. After the independence of India in 1947, the Mysore state merged into the Republic of India.

On 1 November 2006, the government of Karnataka announced the renaming of Shimoga to "Shivamogga", along with nine other cities in the state. The central government approved (12 cities) the request in the October 2014 and the city was renamed on 1 November 2014.

== Geography ==
According to the Shimoga City Municipal Corporation, the city has a total area of about 50 square kilometres (19 sq mi). As per the Smart City Proposal, of the total city area (around 70.01km^{2}), 11.28% area is under OS & green belts while 7% is under water cover. Most/all these hills are part of the Western Ghats, a region known for plentiful rainfall and lush greenery and declared during 2012 as a World Heritage site. Tunga River flows through Shimoga. The river is the major source of drinking water in the city and the city gets its drinking water through the Tunga dam (also known as Gajanuru dam).

=== Climate ===
The climate is tropical wet and dry (Köppen climate classification) summer average temperature 20–35 °C (68–95 °F). This means that the winter and the early part of summer are typically dry periods. The majority of the rainfall occurs between June and early October. Shimoga is a part of a region known as Malnad (land of hills) in Karnataka. The average annual rainfall of the city is 731.1mm. January and February are the driest months, July the wettest, and April is the warmest month with an average high temperature of 35.5 degrees Celsius (95.9 degrees F). Coldest months of Shimoga are July, August, November and December with average high temperature of 27 degrees Celsius (80.6 degrees F). In summer (April–May), temperature crosses 36 °C at Shimoga.

Climate data for Shimoga (1991–2020, extremes 1950–2020)
| Month | Jan | Feb | Mar | Apr | May | Jun | Jul | Aug | Sep | Oct | Nov | Dec | Year |
|---|---|---|---|---|---|---|---|---|---|---|---|---|---|
| Record high °C (°F) | 36.4 (97.5) | 38.8 (101.8) | 41.4 (106.5) | 41.2 (106.2) | 44.0 (111.2) | 40.0 (104.0) | 35.4 (95.7) | 35.0 (95.0) | 38.0 (100.4) | 35.0 (95.0) | 34.4 (93.9) | 34.0 (93.2) | 44.0 (111.2) |
| Mean daily maximum °C (°F) | 31.7 (89.1) | 33.7 (92.7) | 36.3 (97.3) | 36.8 (98.2) | 35.3 (95.5) | 30.9 (87.6) | 28.6 (83.5) | 28.3 (82.9) | 30.0 (86.0) | 30.7 (87.3) | 30.6 (87.1) | 30.4 (86.7) | 32.0 (89.6) |
| Mean daily minimum °C (°F) | 15.6 (60.1) | 17.0 (62.6) | 19.7 (67.5) | 21.8 (71.2) | 22.3 (72.1) | 21.7 (71.1) | 21.0 (69.8) | 20.6 (69.1) | 20.9 (69.6) | 20.3 (68.5) | 18.4 (65.1) | 16.2 (61.2) | 19.6 (67.3) |
| Record low °C (°F) | 6.5 (43.7) | 9.0 (48.2) | 11.7 (53.1) | 11.5 (52.7) | 15.0 (59.0) | 16.0 (60.8) | 15.7 (60.3) | 13.0 (55.4) | 11.5 (52.7) | 11.7 (53.1) | 8.0 (46.4) | 6.0 (42.8) | 6.0 (42.8) |
| Average rainfall mm (inches) | 0.2 (0.01) | 0.4 (0.02) | 5.9 (0.23) | 39.6 (1.56) | 60.9 (2.40) | 129.8 (5.11) | 183.1 (7.21) | 161.4 (6.35) | 98.6 (3.88) | 169.5 (6.67) | 24.1 (0.95) | 8.7 (0.34) | 882.3 (34.74) |
| Average rainy days | 0.0 | 0.1 | 0.4 | 2.6 | 3.9 | 9.9 | 14.3 | 12.9 | 7.0 | 7.3 | 1.7 | 0.6 | 60.7 |
| Average relative humidity (%) (at 17:30 IST) | 40 | 39 | 34 | 45 | 53 | 74 | 80 | 80 | 76 | 70 | 59 | 50 | 57 |
Source: Met Department

== Demographics ==
As of 2011 Indian Census, Shimoga had a total population of 322,650, of which 162,018 were males and 160,632 were females. Population within the age group of 0 to 6 years was 32,691. The total number of literates in Shimoga was 254,531, which constituted 78.9% of the population with male literacy of 81.4% and female literacy of 76.3%. The effective literacy rate of 7+ population of Shimoga was 87.8%, of which male literacy rate was 90.8% and female literacy rate was 84.8%. The Scheduled Castes and Scheduled Tribes population was 40,737 and 9,192 respectively. Shimoga had 76,009 households in 2011.

Religions in Shimoga City (2011)
| Religion | Percent |
| Hinduism | 72.76% |
| Islam | 23.93% |
| Christianity | 2.17% |
| Jainism | 0.82% |
| Other or not stated | 0.32% |
Distribution of religions

Kannada is the most widely spoken language in Shimoga. 72.76% of people are Hindus and 23.93% are Muslims, with rest being Buddhists, Christians and others.

Languages of Shimoga City (2011 census)
1. Kannada (53.5%)
2. Urdu (23.5%)
3. Tamil (6.75%)
4. Telugu (5.91%)
5. Hindi (3.14%)
6. Marathi (2.93%)
7. Konkani (2.28%)
8. Malayalam (0.93%)
9. Others (1.12%)

Kannada is the majority language, spoken by 53.47% of the population. Urdu is the second-largest language, while Tamil, Telugu, Hindi, Marathi and Konkani are also spoken.

== Government and politics ==
=== Civic administration ===
Shimoga is governed by a Municipal Corporation called the Shivamogga City Corporation. The total area under it is 70.01 km^{2} (27.03 sq mi), with a population of 322,650 (Census 2011). Shimoga has been selected under the Smart Cities Mission of the Indian Government under Round 2 of selections. Shimoga was upgraded to a Municipal Corporation from a Municipal Council in 2013.

== Economy ==
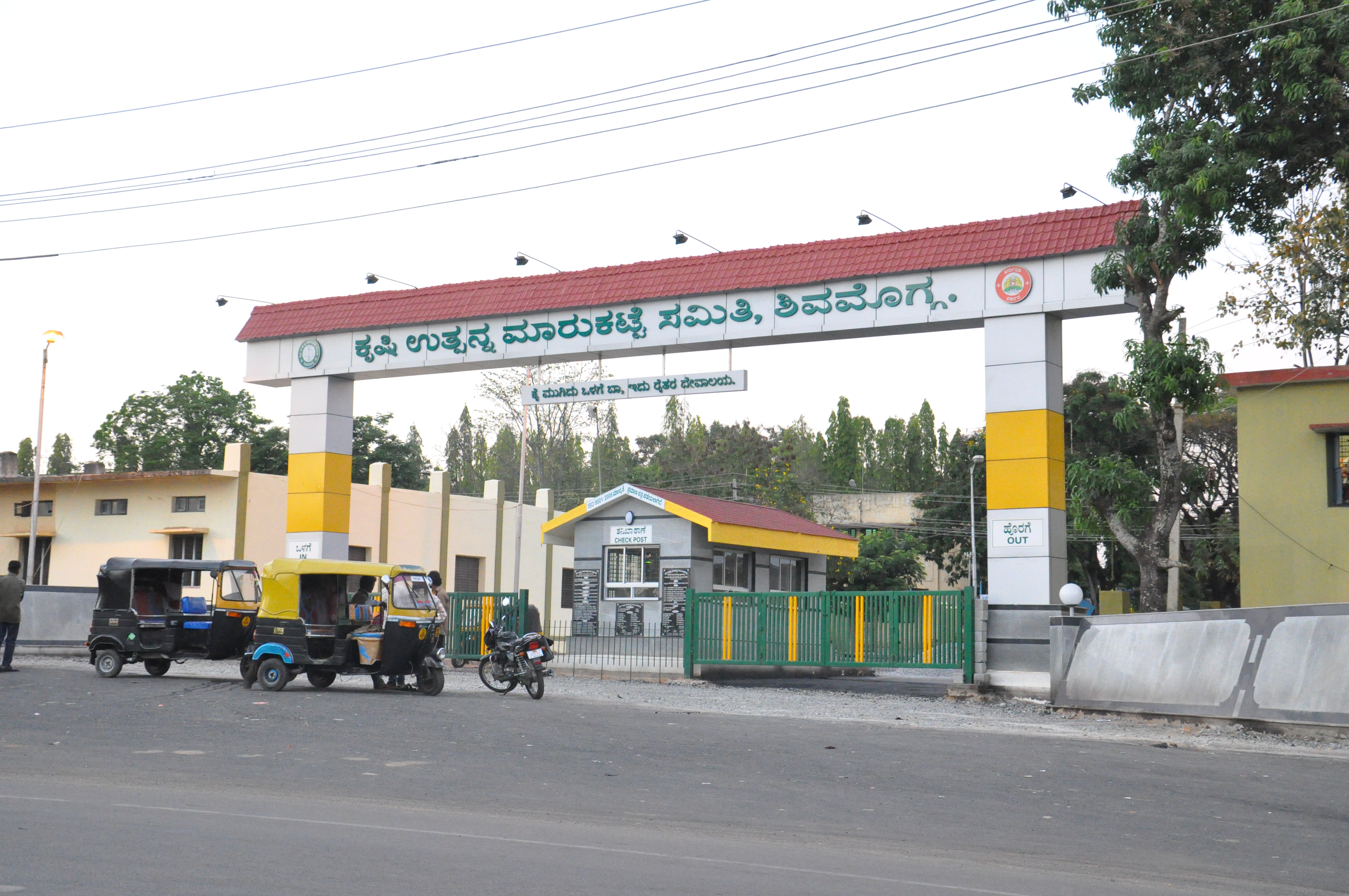
RMC Yard, Shimoga

APMC of Shimoga is main marketing point of areca nut (betel nut), the major commercial crop grown in the district and well as in neighbouring districts like Uttara Kannada. Shimoga has the biggest areca nut market, and known for procuring high quality areca nuts. Other agricultural produces like rice, Maize, chili, coconut etc. are also marketed in APMC.

Shimoga IT Park is an information technology hub built just outside Shimoga near the Shimoga Airport. The IT Park consists of a 100000 sq ft office building with 24/7 electrical capacity, diesel backup generators, and high speed T1 data connections for use by IT industries such as data centres, call centres, aerospace, robotics, etc.

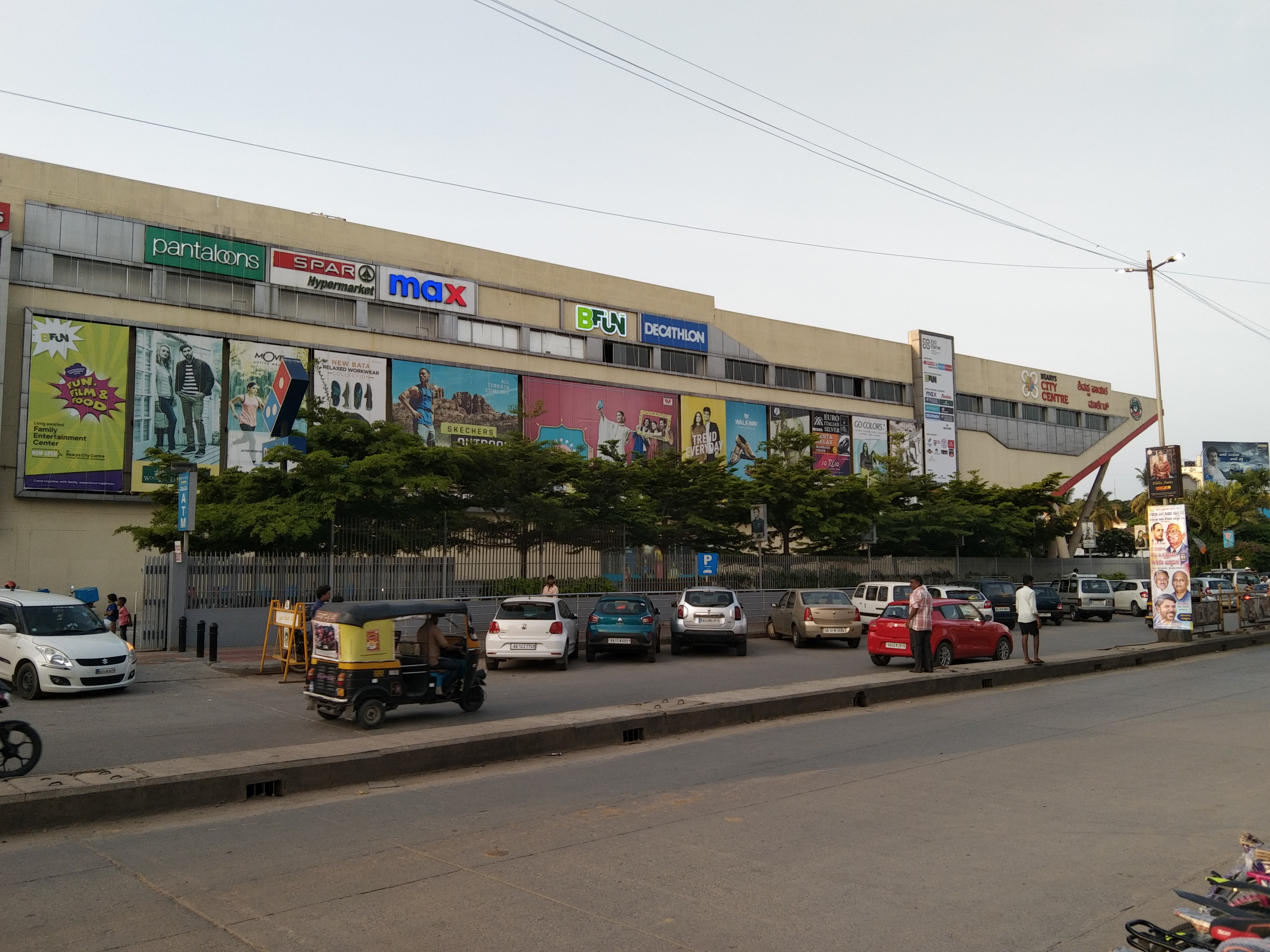
city centre mall shimoga

== Transportation ==
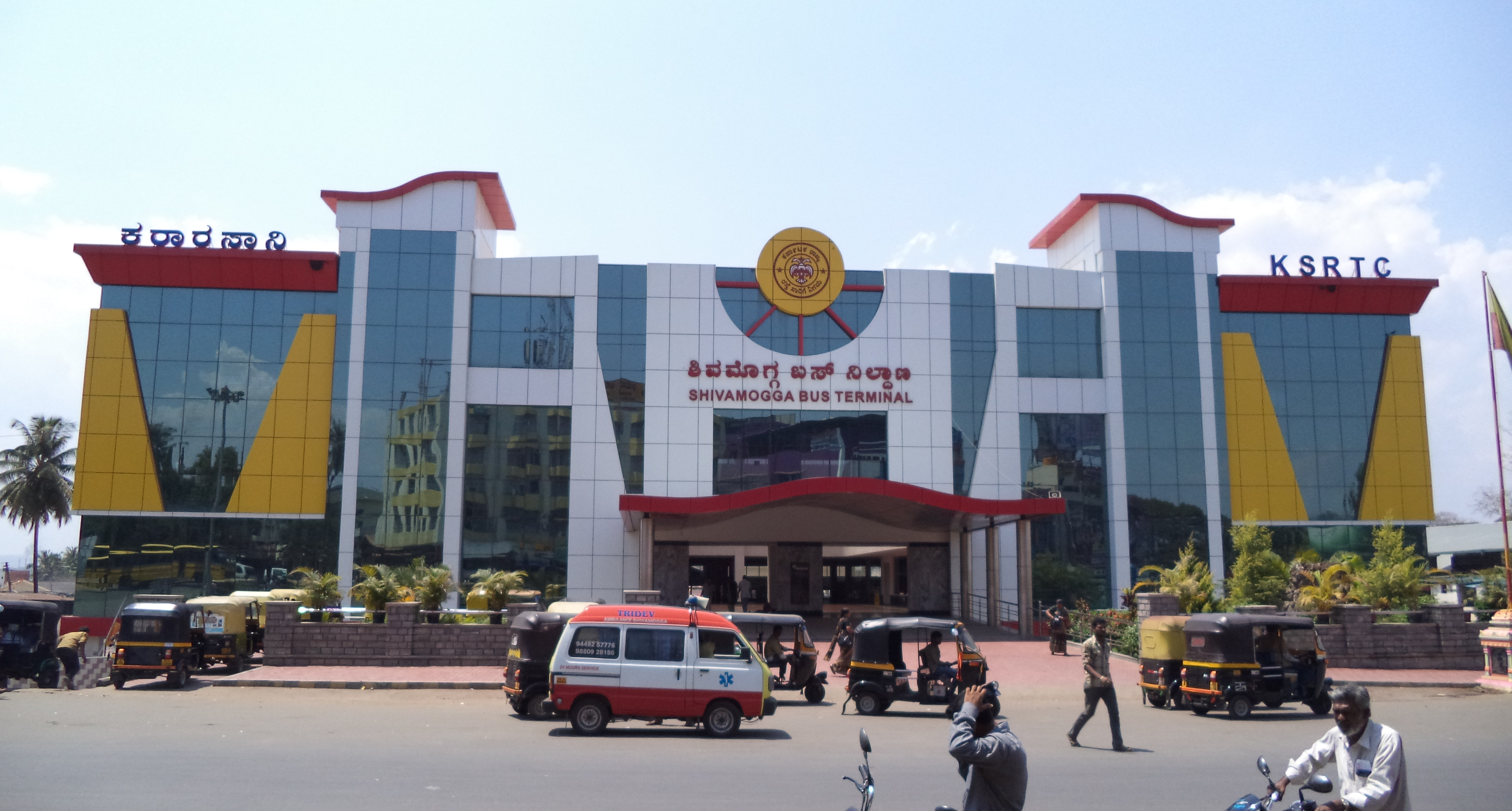
KSRTC Bus Stand

=== Road ===
Shimoga is well connected by road to major cities like Bengaluru, Mysore, Mangalore, Hubli, Davangere, Chitradurga , Ballari. Two major National Highways pass through the city: NH69 and NH169.

=== Rail ===
The city has two railway stations, main one being Shivamogga Town Railway Station, and there are trains that run to and from Bengaluru, Mysore, Tirupati and Chennai.

=== Air ===
Shimoga Airport is situated near Sogane, 13 km south of Shimoga. This is the first airport which is being operated by Karnataka State Industrial & Infrastructure Development Corporation Limited as a wholly owned and undertaking of Government of Karnataka and not handed over to Airport Authority of India. The nearest international airports are Kempegowda International Airport and Mangalore International Airport.

== Education ==
Shimoga is one of the important centers for the high school and the pre-university education in Karnataka. Notable institutes in Shimoga for high school is Jnanadeepa school

The village of Gajanur hosts a Jawahar Navodaya Vidyalaya (central school) which is a boarding school. Kuvempu University is located in Shankarghatta, at a distance of 20 km from Shimoga.

Shimoga Institute of Medical Sciences is the medical sciences college at Shimoga and managed by Government Departments. Subbaiah Institute of Medical Sciences is located at Purale. It also has two engineering colleges, Jawaharlal Nehru National College of Engineering and PES Institute of Technology and Management.

== Notable people ==
- U. R. Ananthamurthy, Jnanapeetha awardee
- Sarekoppa Bangarappa, former Chief Minister of Karnataka
- K. S. Eshwarappa, a politician and former Deputy Chief Minister of Karnataka
- Nikhil Kamath co-founder, Zerodha
- Mathur Krishnamurthy, Kannada language writer
- Kuvempu, a National poet, Jnanapeetha winner
- P Lankesh
- Kadidal Manjappa, 3rd Chief Minister of Karnataka
- Shekhar Naik, a former captain of the Indian blind cricket team
- D. H. Shankaramurthy, Former Chairman of the Karnataka Legislative Assembly
- Khadi Shankarappa, a freedom fighter
- Abhilash Shetty, a film director in Kannada film industry
- Shimoga Subbanna, a playback singer
- Sudeep, an actor and director in Indian cinema
- Archana Udupa, Indian playback singer
- B. S. Yediyurappa, 19th Chief Minister of Karnataka

== See also ==
- Alada Halli, Shimoga
