= Malenadu =

Region in Karnataka, India

Coordinates: 13°10′N 75°30′E

Malenadu Malnad
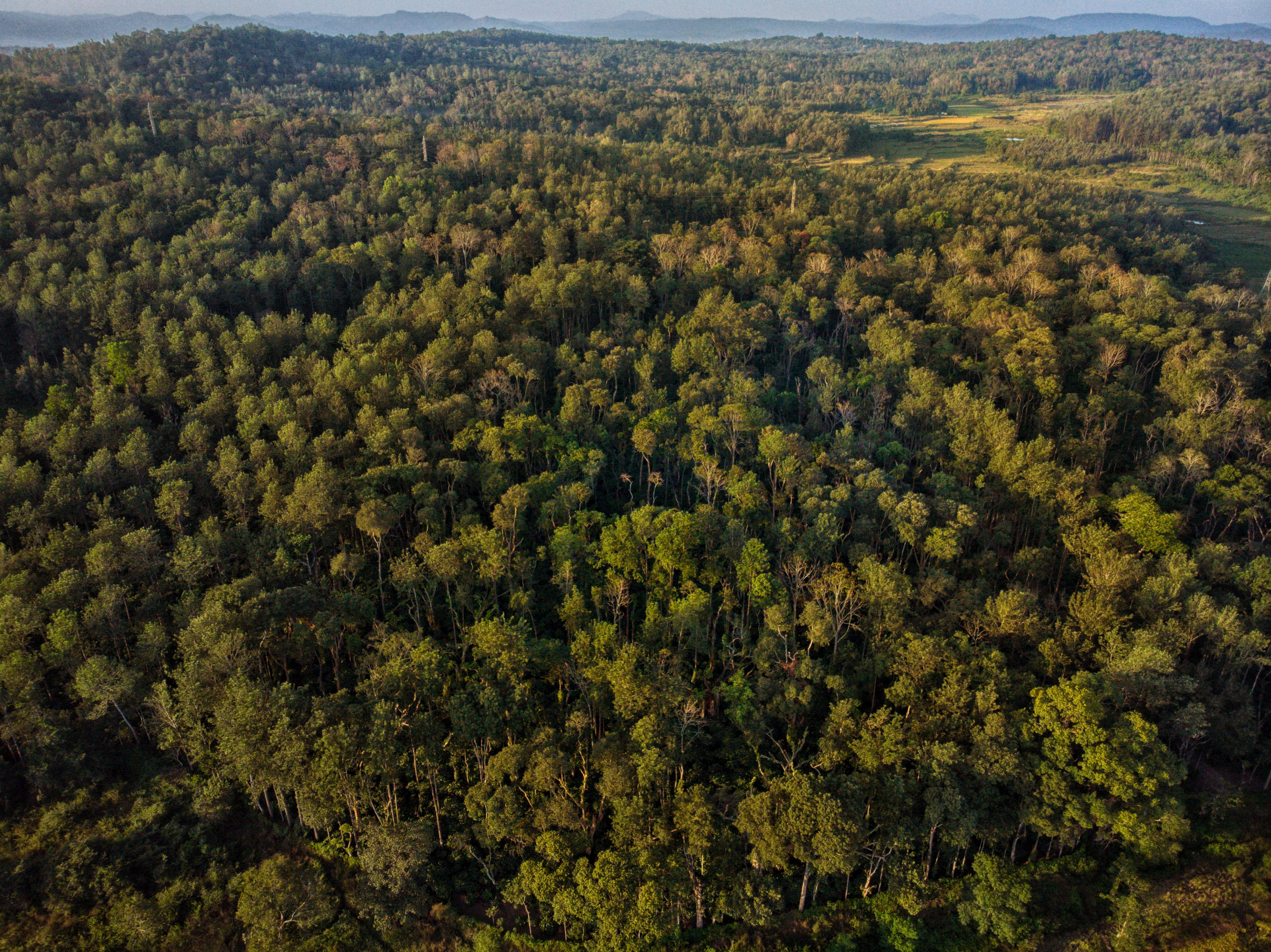
- Forests of Malenadu

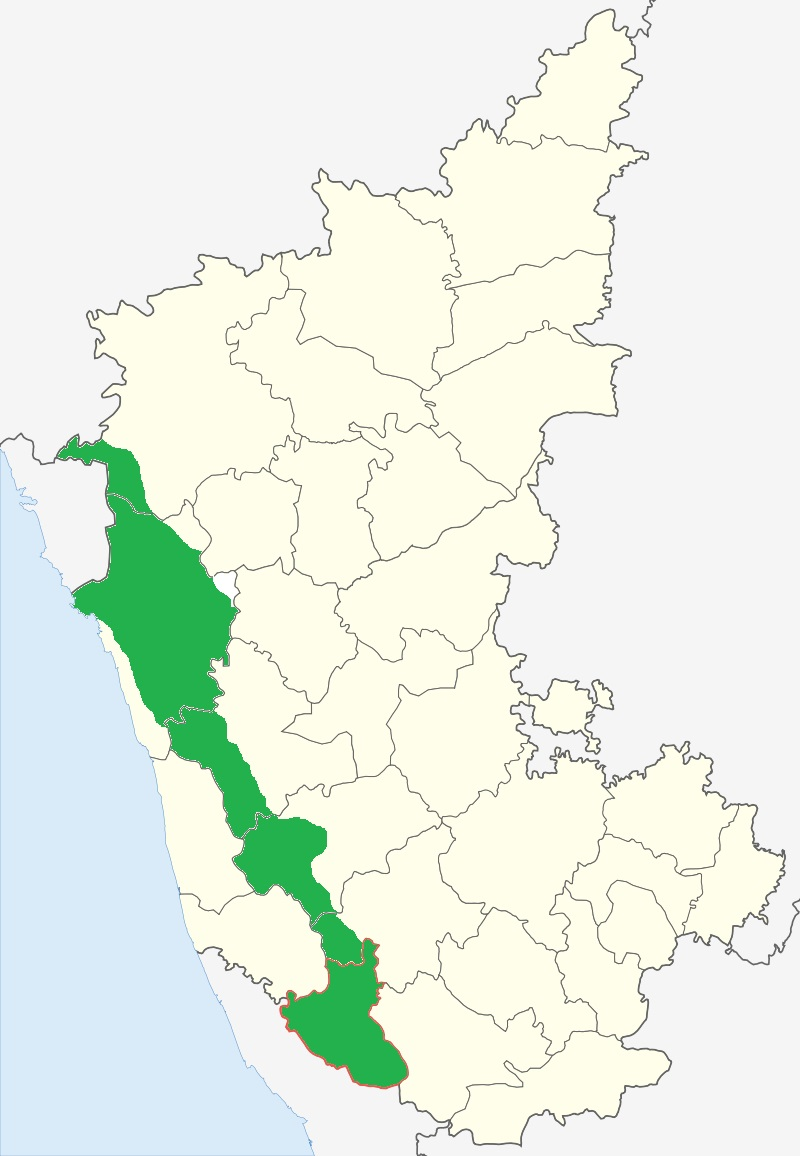
- Malenadu region shown in green
- Country: India
- State: Karnataka
- Region: Malenadu

Languages
  - Official: Kannada
  - Regional: Havyaka Kannada, Kodava, Tulu, Konkani, Arebhashe
- Time zone: UTC+5:30 (IST)

Malenadu (or Malnad, Kannada: [mɐlenaːɖu]) is a geographical region in the state of Karnataka, India. It covers the western and eastern slopes of the Western Ghats mountain range, it also covers the Eastern Ghats range partly. It consists of 13 districts such as Uttara Kannada, Shivamogga, Chikmagaluru, Udupi, Belagavi, Dakshina Kannada, Hassan, Kodagu, Chamarajanagar, Dharwad, Haveri, Davangere, Mysore. The region experiences heavy annual rainfall of 1,000–3,800 millimetres (39–150 inches); most notably, the village of Agumbe in the region, receives the highest annual rainfall in Karnataka of 10,000 millimetres (390 inches).

This region of the state experiences unique infrastructure challenges due to settlement patterns, sparse population, topography, dense forest, and numerous rivulets. Villages in the Malenadu are scattered throughout remote areas. To encourage development in the area, the Area Development Board was created in 1991 to implement necessary projects.

The Malnad region consists of 13 districts however the districts initially covering the region were Shivamogga, Chikkamagaluru, Uttara Kannada, Kodagu, Hassan and Belagavi.

== Etymology ==
The origin of the term Malenadu is unclear, as the word Male in Kannada can have two different meanings depending on pronunciation. Malē (without the retroflex 'ḷ') means ‘mountain,’ and when combined with Nadu (land), it gives the meaning ‘mountainous land,’ reflecting the region’s terrain. With the retroflex 'ḷ', however, Maḷē means ‘rain,’ and thus Malenadu also suggests ‘rainy land,’ a fitting description of the region’s high rainfall. However, Malēnāḍu without the retroflex ḷ is the most commonly used term.

== Climate and geography ==
=== Terrain ===
True to its name Malenadu, the region is endowed with abundant hills and plenty of rainfall. The region comprises 13 districts spanning a broadly sub-coastal North-South axis, and is a prominent section of the Western Ghats. The Western Ghats are pivotal to the climate and seasons across India. The Sahyadri ranges (another name of the Western Ghats) block the rain-bearing South-West monsoon winds from the Arabian Sea, resulting in heavy rainfall along the western windward side and coastal Karnataka, and forming a rain shadow region on the eastern leeward side. Hills, heavy rainfall, rich sub-tropical forests and rivers flowing down the mountains are the defining geographical features. Temperatures in Malenadu remain moderate throughout the year. Summer temperatures remain within 35 °C (95 °F). Winters are mild and pleasant, while the monsoon months between June and September are a time of torrential rains, crossing 3,000 millimetres (120 in) in many stations.

=== Mountain ranges, peaks and waterfalls ===
Malnad has some of the highest mountain peaks in Karnataka. Mullayyanagiri located in the Chandra Drona ranges of the Western Ghats of Chikmagalur Taluk at a height of 1,925 metres (6,316 ft), is the highest peak in Karnataka. Kodachadri, Kodagu (Coorg) are hill-stations in the region. Kemmannugundi, Kudremukh with distinctive horse-face shape, Kalhattagiri, Rudragiri, and Devarammannagudda are other significant mountain peaks also known for their scenic treks across high grasslands.

Apart from the well-known Jog Falls (Gerusoppa), Mallalli Falls in the Pushpagiri range, Mookanamane Falls (or Mookana Mane Falls) near Sakleshpur, Abbey Falls near Madikeri in Coorg, Chelavara Falls (also called Embepare) near the Tadiandamol Peak, Irupu Falls in the Brahmagiri range, Unchalli Falls, (or Lushington Falls, or Keppa Joga) near Sirsi, the 200 ft Magod Falls near Yallapura, Devaragundi Falls near Thodikana, Jhari Falls (Buttermilk Falls) and the Hebbe Falls in Chikmagalur, and Kapilatirtha are some of the other known and visited waterfalls in Malnad.

=== Rivers and groundwater ===
The dense forests and hill ranges of Malenadu region are vital for water security, serving as natural sponges, absorbing the Monsoon precipitation, and for months beyond the season, steadily feeding major rivers like the Sharavathi, Hemavati, Tunga, Bhadra, Krishna, Kali, Kaveri, Kabini, Malaprabha, Ghataprabha, Bhima and Netravathi, which support hydroelectric power projects and provide irrigation and drinking water across Karnataka.

=== Rainfall ===
The Western Ghats acts as the rain barrier during south-west monsoon season. This region is one of the wettest regions in the world, with some rainfall measurements of over 7,000 mm (280 in).

Malenadu rainfall records (2010–2017)
Rank	Hobli / Village	District	Taluk	Year	Rainfall (mm)	Elevation (metres)
1	Devaramane	Chikmagalur district	Mudigere	2013	11,910	1240
2	Hammiyala	Kodagu district	Somwarpet/Madikeri	2017	11,428	1279
3	Amagaon	Belgaum district	Khanapur	2010	10,068	785
4	Mundrote	Kodagu district	Madikeri	2011	9,974	585
5	Hulikal	Shimoga district	Hosanagara	2013	9,383	614
6	Agumbe	Shimoga district	Thirthahalli	2013	8,770	643
7	Kokalli / Kakalli (Sirsi Taluk)	Uttara Kannada	Sirsi	2014	8,746	780
8	Surlabbi	Kodagu district	Somwarpet	2016	8,732	1420

Malenadu villages with highest rainfall
Year	Rainfall (mm)						
Year	Hulikal	Agumbe	Amagaon	Talacauvery	Kokalli	Nilkund	Castle Rock
2017	5,700	6,311	4,733	5,859	3,130	4,981	5,560
2016	5,721	6,449	4,705	5,430	2,682	4,655	4,968
2015	6,035	5,518	4,013	5,319	2,730	4,367	3,667
2014	7,907	7,917	5,580	7,844	8,746	6,710	5,956
2013	9,383	8,770	8,440	8,628	4,464	7,082	3,667
2012	8,409	6,933	5,987	5,722	5,036	5,398	6,165
2011	8,523	7,921	9,368	6,855	4,437	6,593	7,083
2010	7,717	6,929	10,068	6,794	4,002	—N/a	—N/a
2009	8,357	7,982	—N/a	—N/a	—N/a	—N/a	—N/a
2008	7,115	7,199	—N/a	—N/a	—N/a	—N/a	—N/a
2007	9,038	8,255	—N/a	—N/a	—N/a	—N/a	—N/a
2006	8,656	8,457	—N/a	—N/a	—N/a	—N/a	—N/a

== Biodiversity ==
Abundant water, favourable soil and climate conditions, and limited human interaction have endowed the Malnad region with rich biodiversity comprising hundreds of endemic species of flora and fauna. The natural habitats of the region such as the Kudremukh National Park, Bhadra Wildlife Sanctuary, Someshwara Wildlife Sanctuary, Bisle Reserve Forest, MM Hills, Pushpagiri Wildlife Sanctuary, Nagarahole, Bandipur, Mookambika Wildlife Sanctuary, Ranganathittu Bird Sanctuary, Kali Tiger Reserve, Dandeli Wildlife Sanctuary, Shettihalli Wildlife Sanctuary, Kaveri Wildlife Sanctuary, Gendekatte forest, Nagpuri forest, Kabini reserve forest, Bhimgad Wildlife Sanctuary, Ghataprabha Bird Sanctuary, Sharavati Wildlife Sanctuary play a crucial role in the conservation of several endangered species. These protected areas are home to tigers, leopards, deer, peacocks, elephants, gaurs, lion-tailed macaques, hornbills, king cobras, Indian sloth bears as well as countless other plant species. New species of mammals, birds, reptiles, amphibians, insects, plants, lichens and fungi keep getting discovered by field biology researchers. It is not without reason that the Western Ghats is among the eight hottest of biodiversity hotspot in the world.

Responding to the urgency of conservation of endangered riverine fish species like mahseer, haragi, gar, beril, setnai barb, glassy fish and killifish, the Karnataka Biodiversity Board in 2020 recommended setting up fish sanctuaries, or matsyadhamas in numerous riverbeds in Malnad.

== Malnad Cuisine ==
Malnad is known for its unique and diverse cuisine that has a blend of local and coastal Karnataka dishes, Malnad Cuisine is known for its spicy curries and gravies. The region has a rich culinary heritage, and the food here is mostly non-vegetarian. However, the region also has some delectable vegetarian and sweet dishes. Some of the famous dishes are: Akki rotti (flat rice flour bread), Kadubu (rice dumplings), Ottu shavige (rice or raagi noodles) with sweet coconut milk, gase gase (poppy seeds) payasa, idli with sweet coconut chutney, Koli saaru (chicken curry), Mutton ghee roast, mutton chops, Dry fish fry, Bangade fish curry, Neer Dose, Pathrode, Sihi dose (sweet dosa), Hālubai, Jackfruit chips, Yeriappa, pāputtu, and Pandi (pork) curry from Coorg region.

== Anthropogenic threats and challenges ==
Like everywhere else on Earth, climate change is causing noticeable and erratic variations in rainfall and temperature patterns in Malenadu. Apart from the now unavoidable climatic uncertainties, the Malnad region faces major short-term and long-term anthropogenic threats despite, or perhaps due to, its rich natural wealth.

=== Agricultural practices ===
Organised agriculture is known to be practised on land parcels reclaimed from forest clearings for a thousand years. Recent inclination towards intensive plantations, overuse of chemical inputs in farming and monocropping have led to degradation of soil, loss of fertility as well as a far-reaching negative impact on local agro-biodiversity and food-webs.

=== Development projects ===
Sharavathi Pumped Storage Project is a ₹10,240 crore (equivalent to ₹110 billion or US$1.1 billion in 2026) infrastructure initiative proposed by the Karnataka Power Corporation Limited (KPCL), claimed to generate 2,000 MW of renewable energy by storing and releasing water between two existing reservoirs to balance grid loads. The project critically threatens the region's Biodiversity, especially the habitat of the endangered Lion-Tailed Macaque. The Karnataka government’s move to proceed with the Sharavathi Pumped Storage Project without securing full environmental and forest clearances has prompted strong opposition from environmentalists and local communities. It is alleged by litigant individuals and organisations that the project has progressed without the requisite consent from the Ministry of Environment, Forest and Climate Change, and National Board for Wildlife, and that the acquisition of lands necessary for the project remains unresolved. Mapping Malnad, a Bengaluru-based non-governmental organisation, published an elaborate citizen research report on the project, claiming that the Sharavathi Pumped Storage Hydroelectric Project by KPCL is progressing based on inadequate, misleading, and flawed data, raising serious concerns such as the underreporting of forest land diversion and potential ecological impacts.

=== Overtourism ===
As much as large-scale road and energy infrastructure projects, the growing number of casual visitors, tourists in or near ecologically fragile regions such as pristine waterfalls, deep forests and mountainous grasslands is exerting a strain on the delicate ecology of the region. The overcrowding can lead to distress among local residents especially during seasonal tourism peaks. State supported encouragement to tourism is often limited by dangerous terrain, inadequate infrastructure like roads, bridges, lack of safety measures and waste management. There are simultaneous efforts and calls by individuals and environment organisations for caution and restraint. A social media content creator met with a fatal fall in the Western Ghats in July 2024. While some incidents make their way to the news, many more accidents go unreported due to the remote location of most waterfalls.
