= Rainfall in Karnataka =

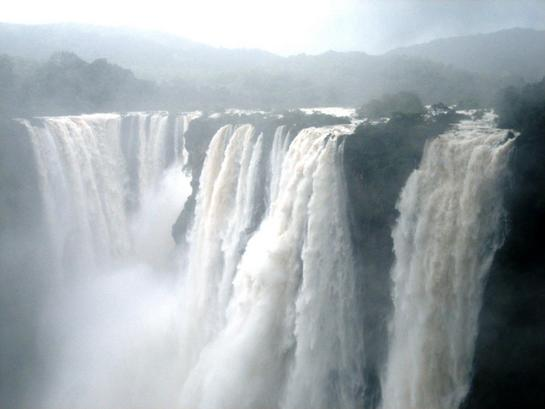
Heavy rains show the full might of Jog Falls in Shimog district

The state of Karnataka in India experiences diverse rainfall quantities across its regions. While Malnad and Coastal Karnataka receive copious amount of rainfall, its north Bayaluseemae region in the Deccan Plateau is one of the most arid regions in the country. Most of the rains received in the state is during the monsoon season. Being an agrarian economy with a large percentage of its citizens engaged in agriculture, the failure of rains can have a crippling effect on the economy of the state. Apart from the benefits in agriculture, the Government of Karnataka has tried to avail other benefits of rainfall using scientific methods. An example of this is the project, Rainwater Harvesting in Rural Karnataka which is initiated by the Karnataka State Council for Science and Technology and is one of the largest rainwater harvesting projects in the world. Agumbe in the Shimoga district, Amagaon in Belgaum District, Hulikal again in Shimoga district and Talakaveri in Madikeri are some of the known places with the highest annual rainfall in South India. Of this Amagaon has received over 10000 mm rain fall twice in 10 years. Naravi is a village in Belthangady taluk also a highest raining village in karnataka but scientifically not recorded.

Agumbe and Hulikal in Shivamogga District of Western Ghat region is considered as "Cheerapunji of South India" but still some places in Western Ghats region had resulted much more rainfall than these two villages. Amagaon in Belgaum District recorded magical number of 10,068mm in the year 2010, Mundrote in Kodagu district recorded 9974mm in the year 2011.

The table below compares rainfall between Agumbe in Thirthahalli taluk in Shimoga district, Hulikal in Hosanagara taluk in Shimoga district, Amagaon in Khanapur Taluk in Belgaum district and Talacauvery and Mundrote in Madikeri taluk in Kodagu district, Kokalli of Sirsi Taluk, Nilkund of Siddapur Taluk, CastleRock of Supa (Joida) Taluk in Uttara Kannada District, Kollur in Udupi District to show which one can be called the "Cherrapunji of South India".

Year	Hulikal Rainfall (mm)	Agumbe Rainfall (mm)	Amagaon Rainfall (mm)	Talacauvery Rainfall (mm)	Kokalli Rainfall (mm)	Nilkund Rainfall (mm)	Castle Rock Rainfall (mm)	Mundrote Rainfall (mm)	Kollur Rainfall (mm)
2017	5,700	6,311	4,733	5,859	3130	4981	5560	1002	5203
2016	5,721	6,449	4,705	5,430	2682	4655	4968	1458	3496
2015	6,035	5,518	4,013	5,319	2730	4367	3667	3143	4254
2014	7,907	7,917	5,580	7,844	8746	6710	5956	5566	3308
2013	9,383	8,770	8,440	8,628	4464	7082	3667	7199	6614
2012	8,409	6,933	5,987	5,722	5036	5398	6165	3727	6715
2011	8,523	7,921	9,368	6,855	4437	6593	7083	9974	7083
2010	7,717	6,929	10,068	6,794	4002	-	-	5042	7685
2009	8,357	7,982	-	-	-	-	-		
2008	7,115	7,199	-	-	-	-	-		
2007	9,038	8,255	-	-	-	-	-		
2006	8,656	8,457	-	-	-	-	-		

The following were the top 5 places that recorded highest rainfall in statistics [2010-2017]

Rank	Hobli/Village	District	Taluk	Year	Rainfall in mm	Elevation in metres
1	Amagaon	Belgaum district	Khanapur	2010	10,068	785
2	Mundrote	Kodagu district/Coorg District	Madikeri	2011	9,974	585
3	Hulikal	Shimoga district	Hosanagara	2013	9,383	614
4	Agumbe	Shimoga district	Thirthahalli	2013	8,770	643
5	Kokalli/Kakalli	Uttara Kannada	Sirsi	2014	8,746	780

The following places recorded highest rainfall with respect to each year [2010-2017]

Year	Place	Taluk	District	Rainfall in mm	Elevation
2017	Agumbe	Thirthahalli	Shimoga district	6,311	634
2016	Agumbe	Thirthahalli	Shimoga district	6,449	634
2015	Hulikal	Hosanagara	Shimoga district	6,035	614
2014	Kokalli	Sirsi	Uttara Kannada	8,746	780
2013	Hulikal	Hosanagara	Shimoga district	9,383	614
2012	Hulikal	Hosanagara	Shimoga district	8,409	614
2011	Mundrote	Madikeri	Kodagu district	9,974	585
2010	Amagaon	Khanapur	Belgaum district	10,068	785

== Importance ==
The economy of Karnataka is mainly agrarian and most of it is dependent on the rainfall; mainly the southwest monsoon. The extent of arid land in the state is second only to Rajasthan. Only 26.5% of sown area (30,900 km²) is subjected to irrigation and hence the rest of the cultivated land is entirely dependent on rainfall. Rainfall also influences the quantity of water available in the rivers which in turn influences the amount of drinking water available to the population and the amount of electricity that can be generated in the hydroelectric power stations in the state. The importance of rainfall is such that Karnataka sometimes had to resort to costly artificial methods like cloud seeding in order to induce rain artificially. Rainfall is also crucial to recharge the depleting ground water and Karnataka has come up with innovative methods like rainwater harvesting in order to solve the drinking water scarcity in the state.

=== Rainwater harvesting ===
Karnataka is a pioneer in the concept of rainwater harvesting with The Karnataka State Council for Science and Technology (KSCST) implementing one of the largest rainwater harvesting projects in the world. 23683 schools in rural Karnataka were selected for this project with the main goal of providing drinking water by using the method of rooftop harvesting. In this project, rainwater collected on the rooftop is channeled through a system of PVC pipes and stored in an enclosed surface tank. The pipeline consists of a first-flush filter which flushes out the first rainfall along with other contaminants that may exist on the roof and then subsequent cleaner rainwater is allowed to pass on to the tank. A sand bed filter is used to further eliminate impurities in the water before it gets collected in the tank. Further precautions are taken to prevent dust and insects from entering the tank.

== Consequences ==
=== Deficient rainfall ===
A year of deficient rainfall leads to the following consequences:

- Agricultural output will be impacted: While this has a direct impact on the economy of the state, it also leads to other social issues like the suicide of farmers. Due to the crop failure, the farmers would not be in a position to repay the loans they had taken for agriculture and few of them take an extreme step of suicide.
- Drinking water scarcity: A lot of towns and cities in Karnataka are dependent on rivers for the supply of drinking water and any deficiency in rainfall leads to the lesser amount of drinking water being supplied to the homes.
- Shortage of electricity: Deficient rainfall leads to a drop in the amount of electricity produced by hydroelectric projects and hence drastic measures like compulsory power cuts have to be employed to counter this shortage.

=== Excess rainfall ===
Heavy rains can lead to a significant loss of life and property and also cause damage to the crops. Excess rains also cause an impact in major cities with inundated roads causing traffic jams. An example of this was in the year 2005 when the Madivala lake overflowed on to the Hosur Road in Bangalore forcing many schools and offices to close.

== Rainfall distribution ==
The average annual rainfall in Karnataka is 1248 mm. The state is divided into three meteorological zones. North Interior Karnataka, South Interior Karnataka, and Coastal Karnataka. Coastal Karnataka with an average annual rainfall of 3456 mm is one of the most rainy regions in the country. Contrasting this, South Interior Karnataka and North Interior Karnataka receive only 1126 and 731 mm of average annual rainfall.

== Districts ==
The average annual rainfall in the districts of Karnataka varies from 562 mm (22.1 in) in the Bagalkot district to 4,119 mm (162.2 in) in the Udupi District. Bagalkot, Chitradurga and Koppal are the districts which receive the least rainfall whereas Udupi, Dakshina Kannada, Uttara Kannada, Hassan, Kodagu, Chickmagalur and Shivamogga districts receive the heaviest rainfall.

Annual Rainfall in Karnataka 1991-2005

Average annual rainfall in the districts of Karnataka
District	Average annual rainfall	
District	mm	inches
Bengaluru Urban	978	38.5
Bengaluru Rural	885	34.8
Chitradurga	573	22.6
Davanagere	700	28
Kolar	744	29.3
Shivamogga	1,813	71.4
Tumkuru	688	27.1
Bagalkote	562	22.1
Belagavi	808	31.8
Vijapura	578	22.8
Dharwad	772	30.4
Gadag	612	24.1
Haveri	753	29.6
Uttara Kannada	2,835	111.6
Bellary	636	25.0
Bidar	847	33.3
Gulbarga	777	30.6
Koppal	572	22.5
Raichur	621	24.4
Chamarajanagar	751	29.6
Chikmagaluru	1,925	75.8
Dakshina Kannada	3,975	156.5
Hassan	1,031	40.6
Kodagu	2,718	107.0
Mandya	806	31.7
Mysuru	798	31.4
Udupi	4,119	162.2
