= Charekone =

Village in Karnataka, India

- Location in Karnataka, India
- Coordinates: 14°27′43″N 74°44′47″E
- Country: India
- State: Karnataka
- Region: Malenadu
- District: Uttara Kannada
- Educational District: Sirsi
- Nearest Large City: Sirsi

Languages
  - Official: Kannada
  - Dialect: Sirsi Kannada
- Time zone: UTC+5:30 (IST)
- PIN: 581xxx
- Telephone code: +91 0(838x)
- Vehicle registration: KA 31 Sirsi

Charekone is a small village in Siddapura Taluk Uttara Kannada District, Karnataka State; Which is about 32 kilometres (20 mi) from Sirsi and 28 kilometres (17 mi) from Siddapur.

It is nestled among the Western Ghats of Karnataka. Areca nut cultivation is the primary occupation of the people in this village.

== Demography ==
Sirsi Kannada Dialect & Havigannada is the spoken language.

== Transport ==
Bus service is provided by KSRTC, which runs buses that connect Charekone to Sirsi.

The nearest railway station is Talaguppa, which is 58 kilometres (36 mi) - connects Shimoga, Mysore, Bangalore, Chennai, Hydrabad etc., and Kumta, which is about 62 kilometres (39 mi) - connects Karwar, Goa, Mumbai, Pune, Mangalore and Kerala.

The nearest airport is Hubli Airport, which connects Bangalore and Mumbai, which is about 140 kilometres (87 mi) from Charekone.

== Economy and occupations ==
The main occupation of the residents is agriculture. Growing Supari (arecanut) is the primary business of the people. Other than arecanut, commodities like paddy, cardamom, coconut and pepper also grown.

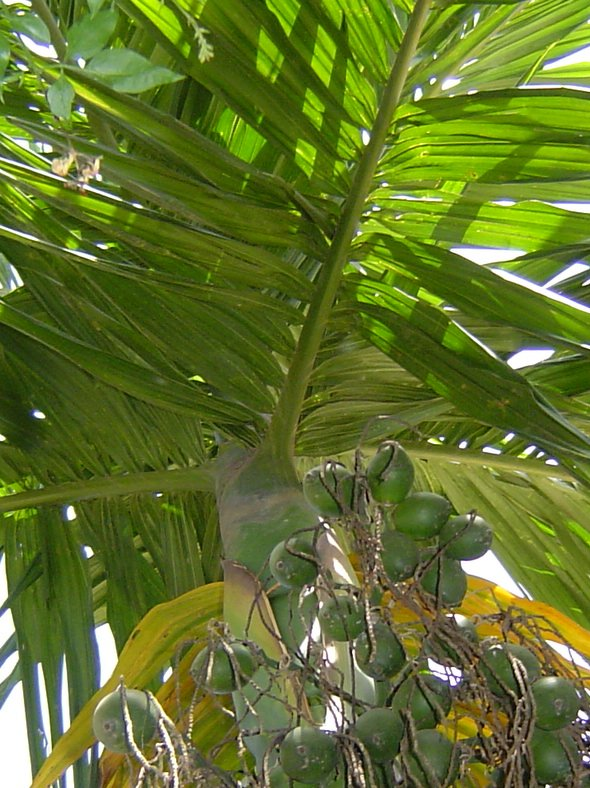
Beetle Nut Tree

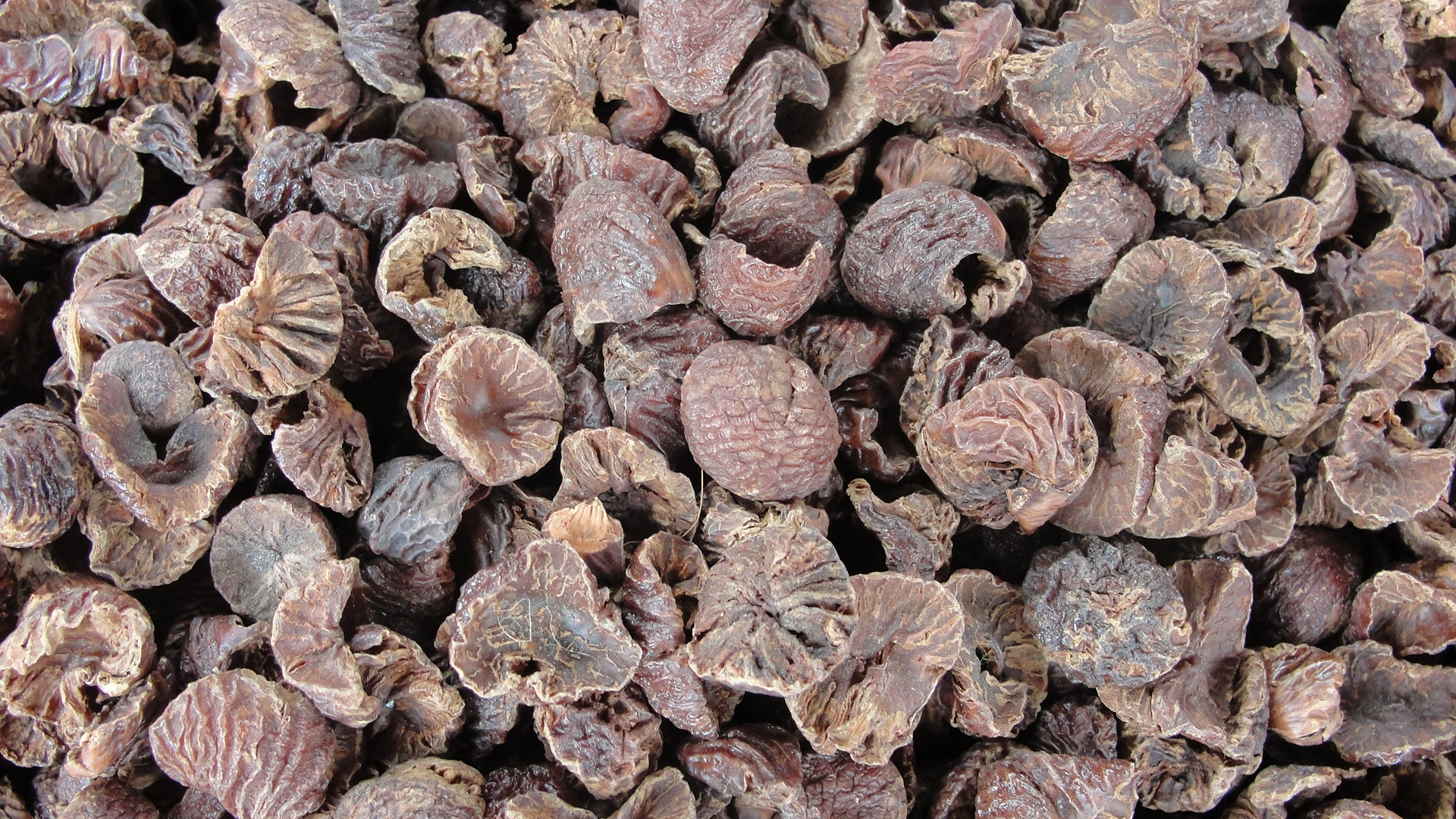
Beetle Nut

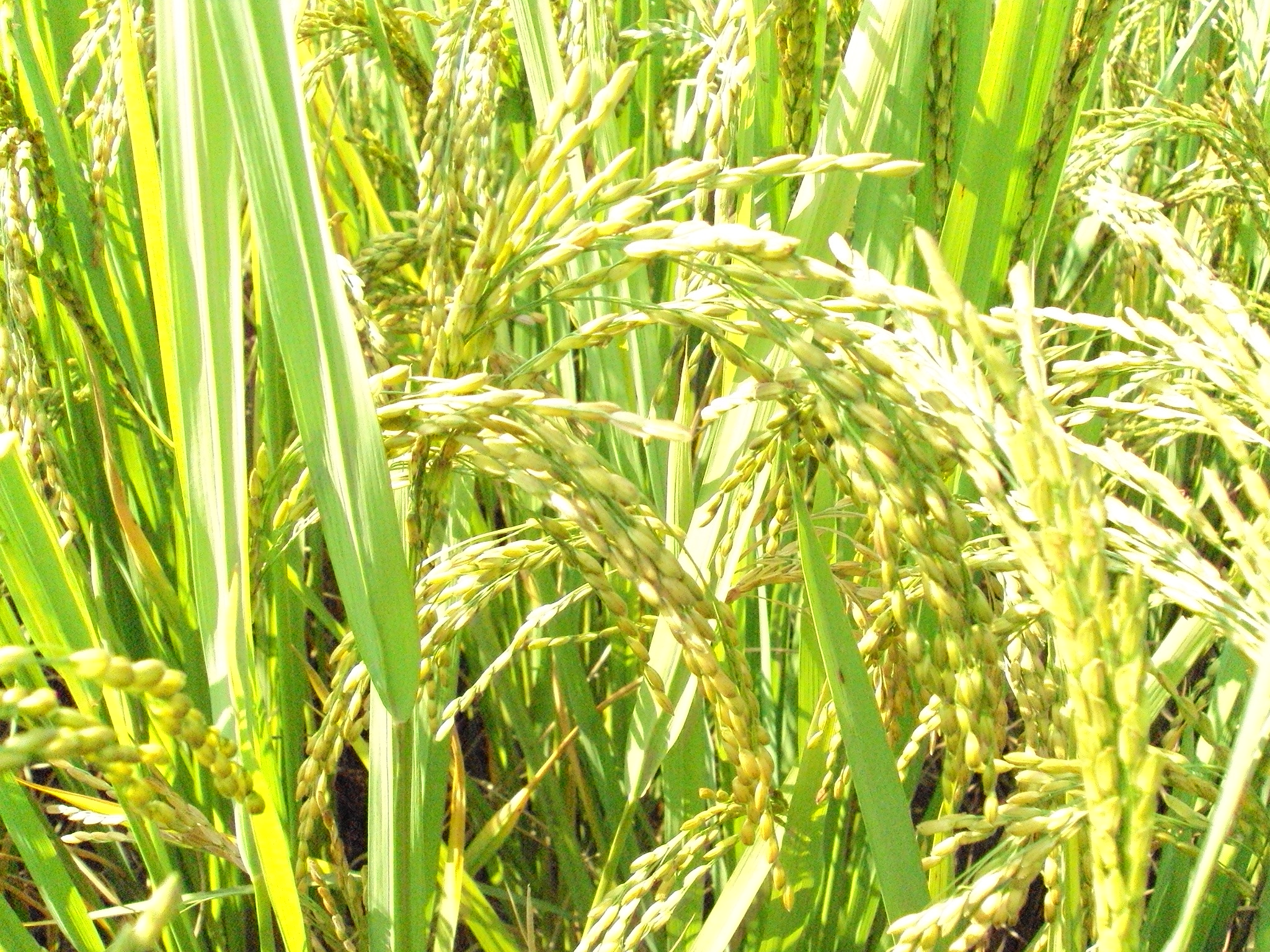
Rice field

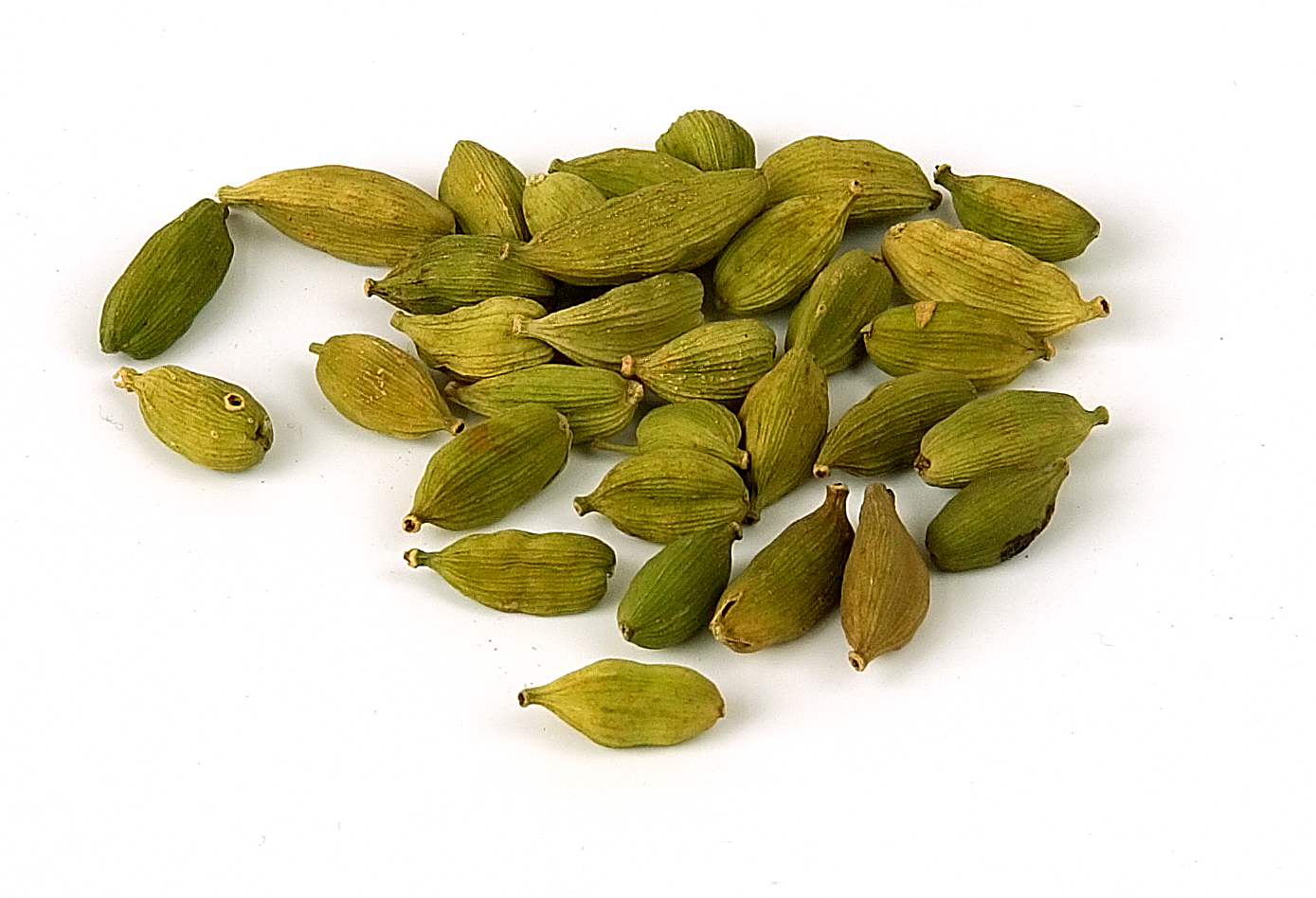
Cardamom

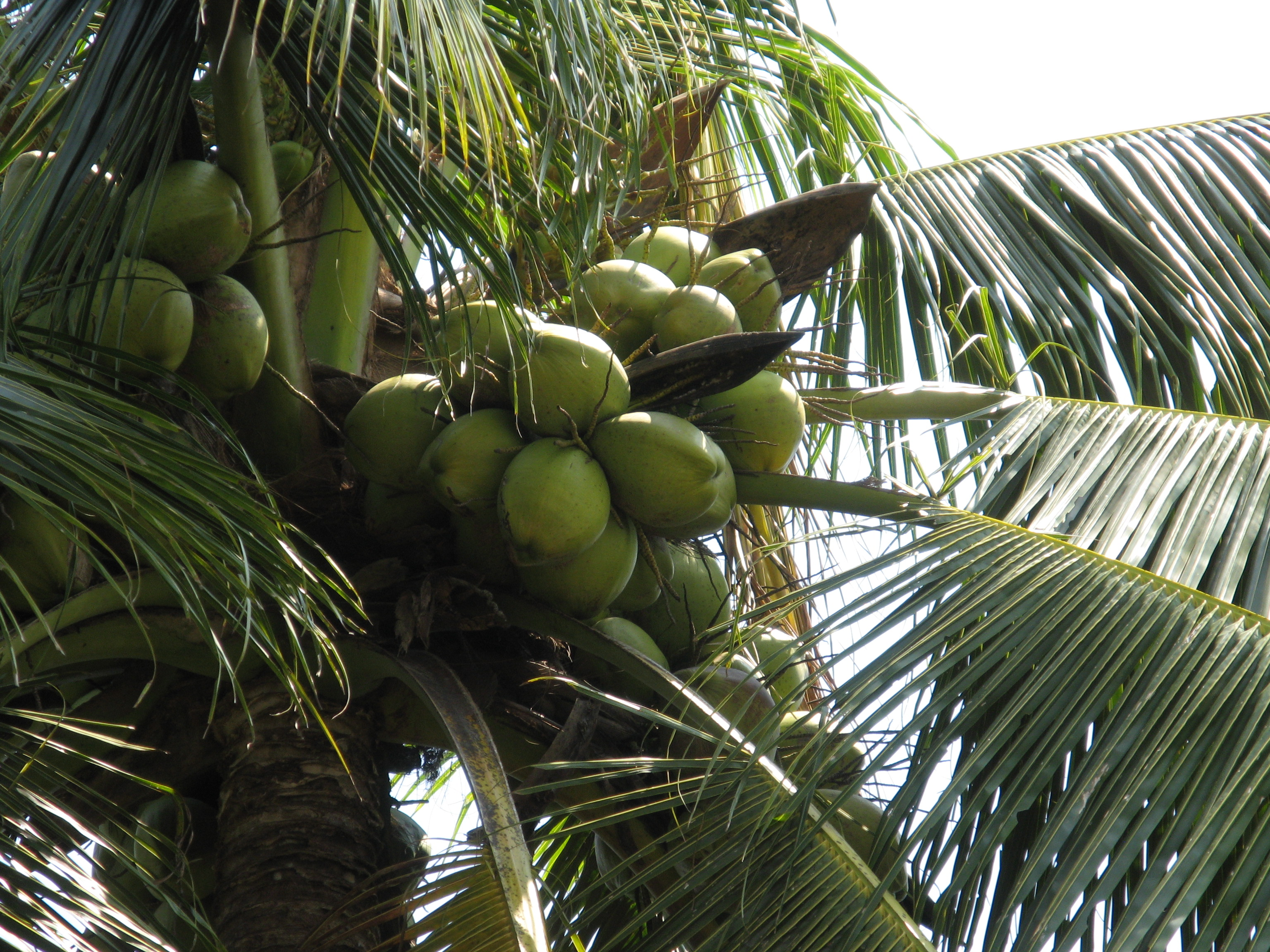
Coconut

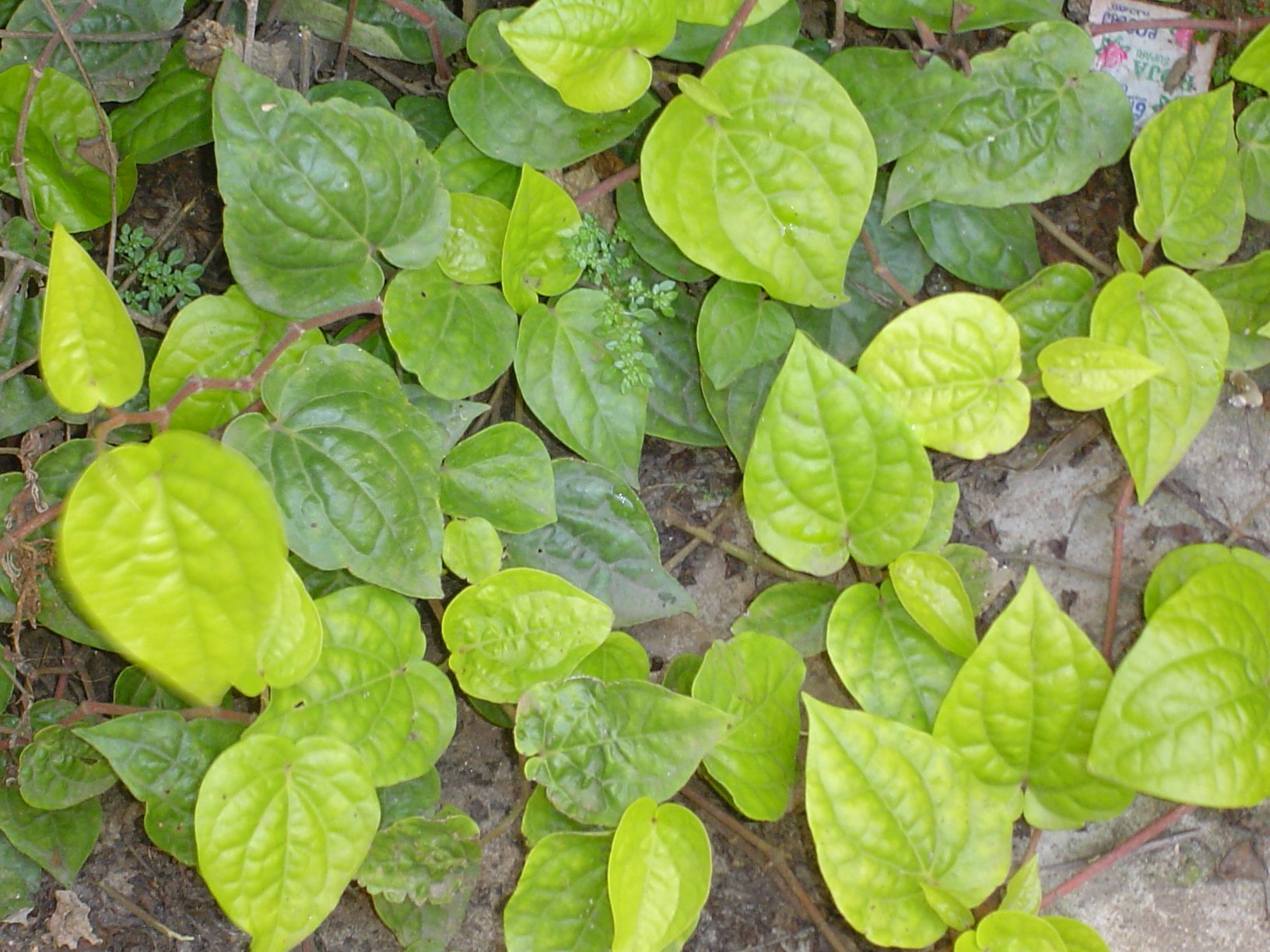
Betle Leaf

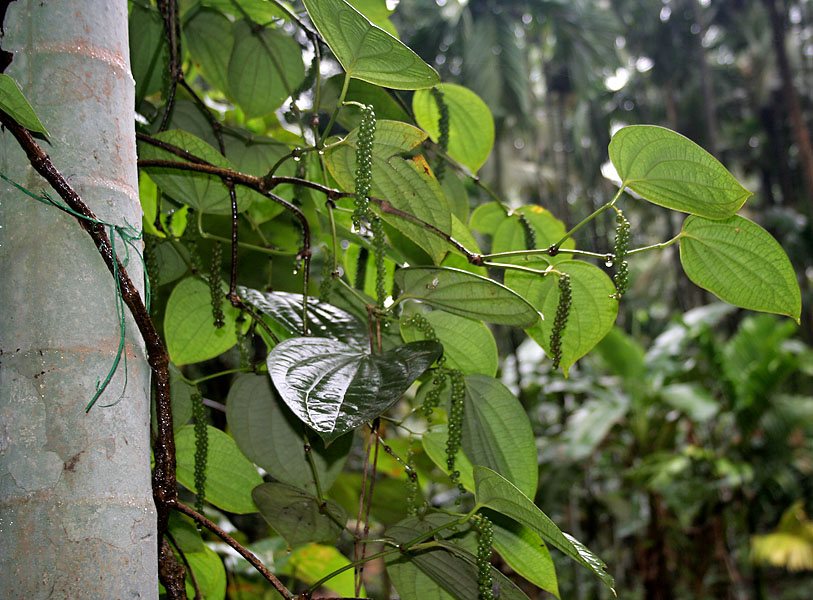
Pepper Plant

== Temples ==
Nearest temples are Kalleshwara (Shiva) Temple in Magodjaddi Village which is approximately 1 kilometre (0.62 mi) from Charekone, Ganapathi Temple in Heggarabilu Village which is about 2 kilometres (1.2 mi) from Charekone.

== Places to see near Charekone ==
The region located in the Malnad region, within the Western Ghats. There are forests and hills and waterfalls that are attractive for trekking.

- Unchalli Falls (KeppaJoga)
- Lakshmi Narasimha Temple, Shriman Nelemavu Mutt.
- Siddivinayaka Temple, Herur
