= Ainbail =

- village
- Location in Karnataka, India Ainbail (India)
- Coordinates: 14°27′N 74°46′E
- Country: India
- State: Karnataka
- District: Uttara Kannada
- Taluk: Siddapur

Government
  - Body: Gram Panchayat

Languages
  - Official: Kannada
- Time zone: UTC+5:30 (IST)
- Nearest city: Siddapur

Ainbail is a village in the southern state of Karnataka, India. It is located in the Siddapur taluk of Uttara Kannada district in Karnataka.

== See also ==
- Uttara Kannada
- Districts of Karnataka
