= Dantkal =

Dantkal is a village near Sirsi, belongs to Siddapura Taluk, North Kanara, State of Karnataka, India. All people staying in this village are Havyaka Brahmins, and the village is only connected by roads from Sirsi and Siddapur. This place is famous for "Kemmannu" And is known as Kemmannu Dantkal. The place is on the shore of river "Aghanashini". "Agha" means "sin" and "Nashini" means "remover". Dantkal is mainly famous for Ananta Bhattana Appe. This is a different type of mango. Locations Dantkal is near Balur and 1.5 km from Balur and its 9 km from Kansur. Every side is full of forest. one side is in the AGHANASHINI River. Most of the people are Areconout groves. Some of the younger generations of people are in Bangalore, Sirsi, the US, Hyderabad, etc. Dantkal from sirsi 22 km from siddapura 33 km.

Notable Areas

- Kemmannu Gudda
- Kote Gudda
- Theppe Sawalu Kallu

Saragallu hole Balepatte Chowka Ananth Bhattana Appe Mara (Mango Tree)
