= Aigod =

- village
- Aigod is in Uttara Kannada district

- Location in Karnataka Location in India
- Coordinates: 14°24′N 74°56′E
- Country: India
- State: Karnataka
- District: Uttara Kannada
- Talukas: Siddapur

Government
  - Body: Village Panchayat

Languages
  - Official: Kannada
- Time zone: UTC+5:30 (IST)
- PIN: 581355
- Nearest city: Siddapur
- Civic agency: Village Panchayat

Aigod is a village in the state of Karnataka, India. It is located in the Siddapur taluk of Uttara Kannada district in Karnataka.

== See also ==
- Uttara Kannada
- Districts of Karnataka
