= Thodikana =

- town
- Location in Karnataka, India Thodikana (India)
- Coordinates: 12.511079°N 75.469894°E
- Country: India
- State: Karnataka
- District: Dakshina Kannada

Population (2011)
  - Total: 2,174

Languages
  - Official: Tulu Kannada
- Time zone: UTC+5:30 (IST)
- Nearest city: Sullia, puttur Madikeri

Thodikana is an Indian village nestled in the foothills of the Western Ghats in southern Karnataka. It is in the Sullia taluk of Dakshina Kannada district, about 100 km from Mangalore city. This village has much greenery and attracts visitors with its cultural and natural sites.

Thodikana is known most for its Mallikarjuna temple, which was probably built sometime in the 13th century. The temple gets many hundreds of visitors each week. A few meters southeast of the temple there is a fish tank known as meenugundi. Visitors traditionally feed the fish raw rice. Killing the fish is forbidden.

The temple offers free mid-day meals to pilgrims daily as a prasadam. A waterfall called Devaragundi is situated about 1.5 kilometers from the temple.

Thodikana village is largely agricultural, with many arecanut (betelnut), coconut, rubber, vanilla, and pepper plantations.

== Transportation and Accommodation ==
The following transportation options are available for travelling to Thodiakana:

- Private buses available every hour to the taluk center, Sullia.
- Private jeeps can be hired from Sullia, Aranthodu or other nearby places.
- Roads connecting two major cities of Karnataka; Mysore and Mangalore run near Thodikana.
- The nearest place to get accommodation is Sullia(Sulya).

== Main attractions ==
- The Payaswini river flows through Thodikana.
- Kolikkamale mountain is a famous trekking place near Thodikana.
- Bhagandeshwara Temple of Bhagamandala, around 18 kilometers from Thodikana, is a famous pilgrimage location.
- Devaragundi waterfall isaround 1.5 km from Thodikana village.
- Talacauvery is situated around 22 km from Thodikana.
- A few meters southeast of the Thodikana temple there is a fish tank 'Meenagundi' which belongs to the temple which is very famous in Mangalore district.
- The Mallikarjuna temple is the most famous temple of Lord Shiva in Sullia Taluk.

== People and Culture ==
The majority of residents of Thodikana speak Tulu. Other languages spoken by residents include Are Bhashe, Kannada, Havyaka Kannada, Tamil and Malayalam.

== See also ==
- Havyaka

Nearby cities/towns

- Sullia
- Sulya
- Mangalore
- Madikeri
- Puttur
- Kasargod
- Kukke Subramanya
