= Suqakollo =

Suqakollos (also known as waru-warus) are elevated crop fields designed to promote water conservation in agriculture. Originating in the highlands of the Puno Region in Peru, Suqakollo fields were implemented by indigenous Andeans to supply food crops with water through the creation of specialized stepwells.

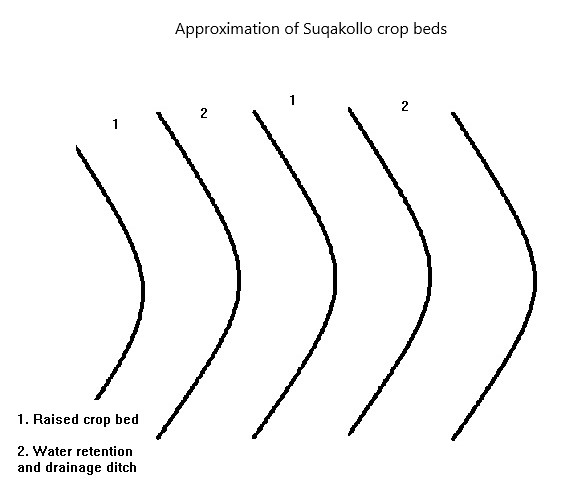
A diagram depicting the layout of Suqakollo crop beds.

== History and design ==
Suqakollo were first implemented by Indigenous farmers in the highlands of what is now Peru between 3000 and 1000 B.C. Records indicate that the system declined around 400 A.D before seeing a resurgence in 1000 A.D. No records were made of Suqakollos after 1450 A.D. As of 2015, the Aymara people have begun to revive the practice in the Andean highlands of Peru and Bolivia.

The Suqakollo method of farming is intended to conserve water for farming by trapping moisture in trenches in front of and behind a raised strip of cultivated soil. These trenches serve a double purpose, holding water during times of drought while also draining water during heavy rains. Historically, the farming practice was most common at higher revelations where rainfall was less consistent than at lower elevations. In addition to providing protection and resources for food crops, Suqakollo also allow highland grasses to grow around the trenches. This effect creates pasture for Alpacas and Llamas.
