= Doddamane Mahadevi Hegde =

Indian activist (1906–2006)

Doddamane Mahadevi Hegde (Mahadevi Tai) was an Indian freedom activist. She was born in 1906, and she was the cousin of the former Chief Minister of Karnataka late Ramakrishna Hegde. A child widow, she was the daughter of Doddamane Krishnaiah Subbaiah Hegde of Siddapura taluk in Uttara Kannada district, whose family is well known for its sacrifices during the Indian Freedom Movement in Bombay Karnataka. Plunging into the Freedom Movement in 1930, she joined Mahatma Gandhi's ashram at Wardah. She was a close associate of Acharya Vinobha Bhave and Jamnalal Bajaj.

Mahadevi Tai, as she was called, joined the Indian National Congress and later the Sarvodaya Movement run by Acharya Vinobha Bhave.

Mahadevi Tai went to jail three times during the freedom struggle. She is the founder of the Vishwaneedam Trust and the Vallabh Niketan in Bangalore, one of the Six Ashrams of Acharya Vinoba Bhave.
