= Grama Vokkaliga =

Subgroup of Halakki Vokkaliga community of Karnataka

Grama Vokkaliga is a sub group of Vokkaliga community of Karnataka residing in Uttara Kannada district. The people from this community are situated in the coastal area, namely Honnavar and Kumta, and highlands namely Siddapur and Sirsi of Uttara Kannada district. In Honnavar, Siddapur and Sirsi they are being called by the surname Gowda and in Kumta by Patagar/ Patgar.

Grama vokkaligas are basically farmers/ agriculturists. Vokkaliga is a Kannada word of considerable antiquity and Grama refers to this group of people residing in grama/villages.
