= Talakaveri =

Birth place of River Kaveri

- Temple Village
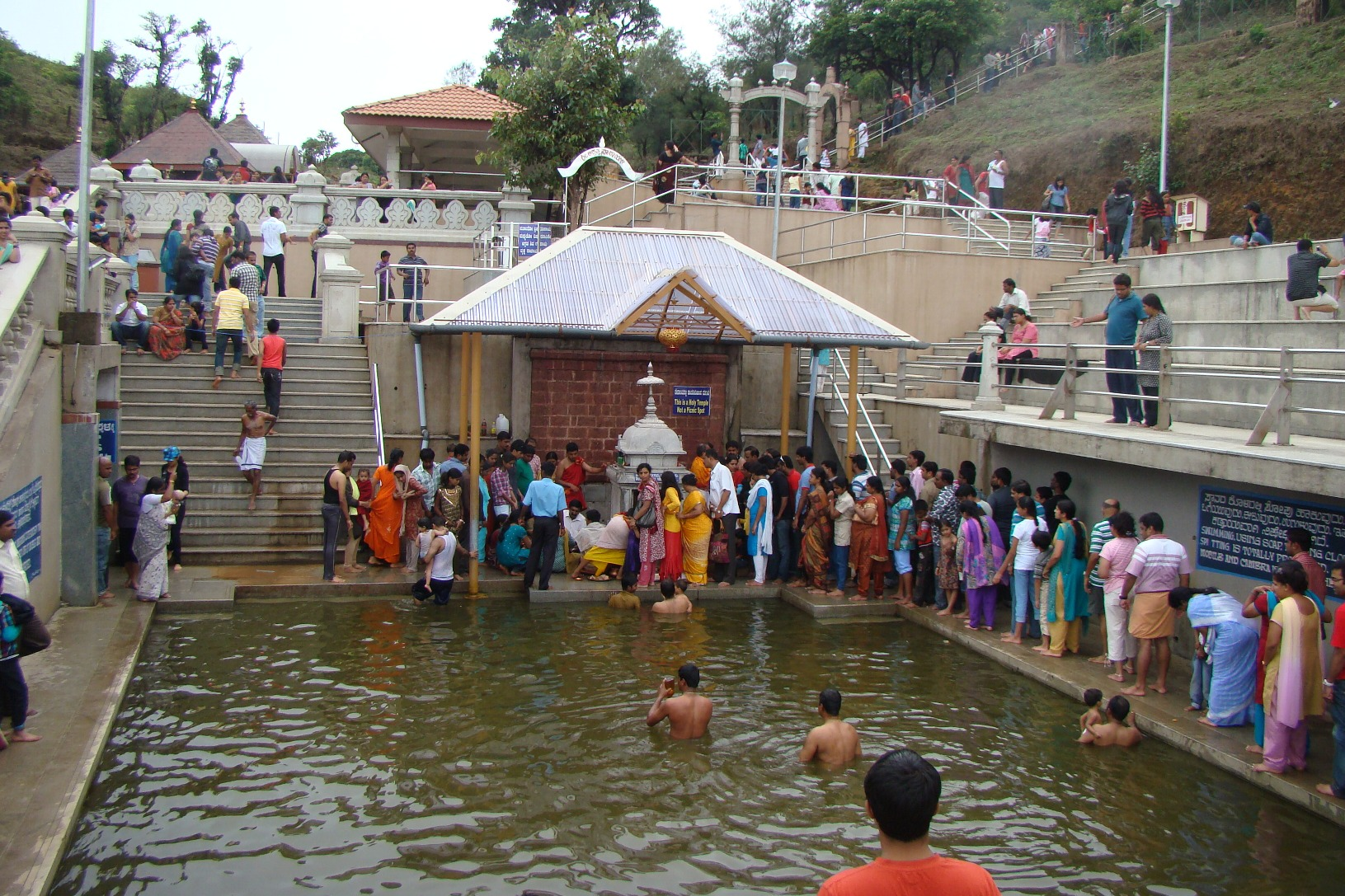
- Talakaveri - Source of Kaveri

- Location within Karnataka Location within Kerala Location within India
- Coordinates: 12.385480°N 75.491432°E
- Country: India
- State: Karnataka
- District: Kodagu
- Elevation: 1,276 m (4,186 ft)

Languages
  - Official: Kannada
- Time zone: UTC+5:30 (IST)

Talakaveri Temple
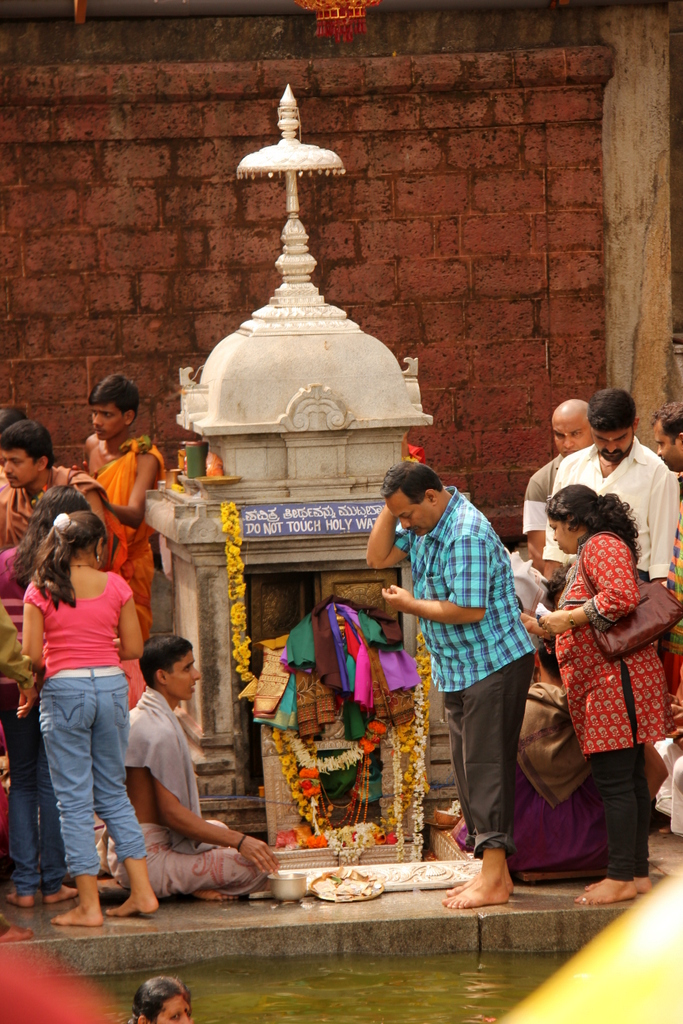
- Goddess Kaveramma

Religion
- Affiliation: Hinduism
- District: Kodagu
- Deity: Kaveramma (Kaveri Matha)
- Festival: Tula Shankramana

Location
- Location: Brahmagiri hills, Bhagamandala, India
- State: Karnataka
- Country: India
- Interactive map of Talakaveri Temple

Architecture
- Elevation: 1,276 m (4,186 ft)

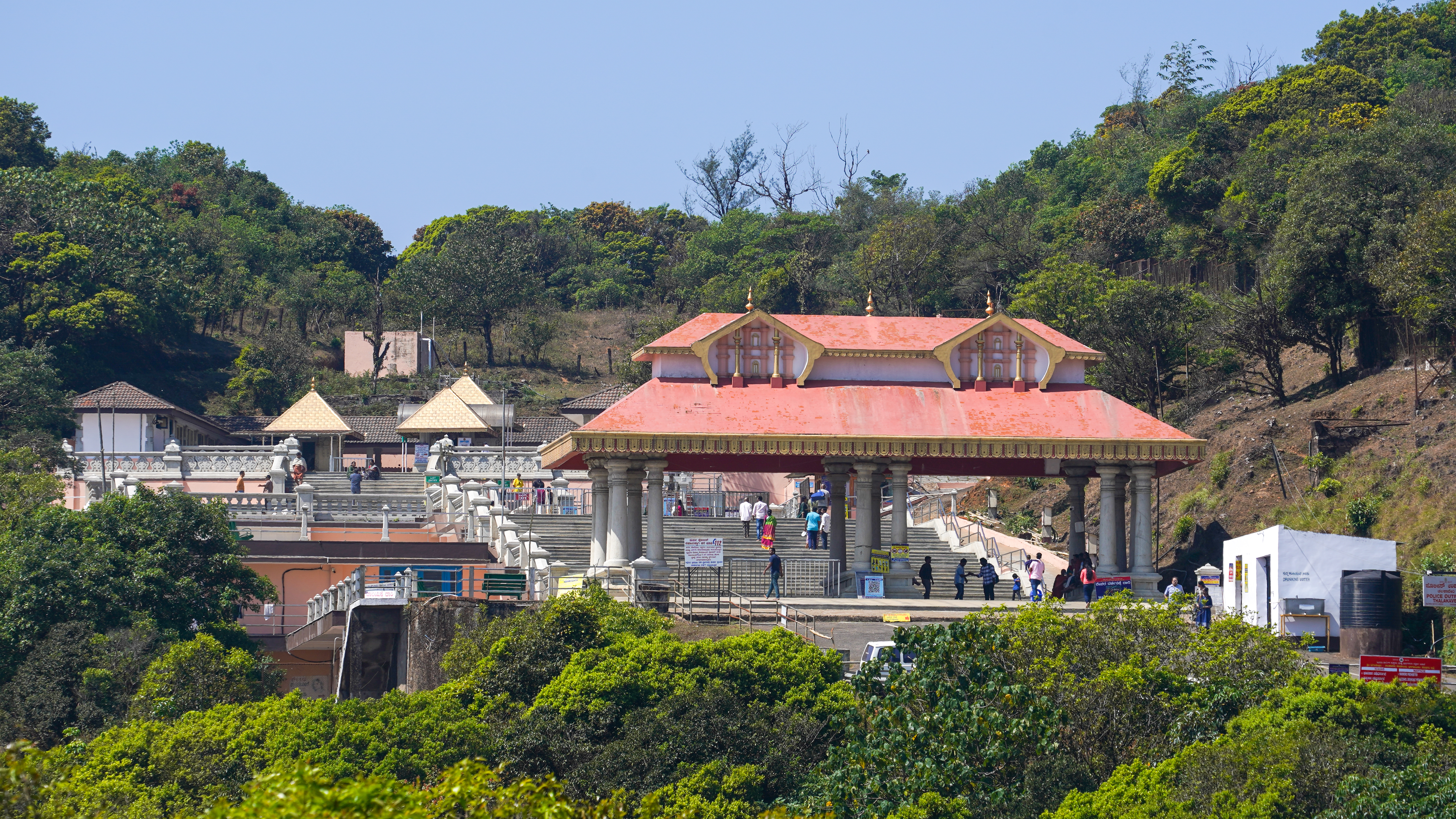
Talakaveri gate and temple

Talakaveri or Talacauvery is the place that is generally considered to be the source of the river Kaveri and a holy place for many Hindus. It is located on Brahmagiri hills near Bhagamandala in Kodagu district (Coorg), in the South Indian state of Karnataka. It is located close to the border with Kasaragod district, Kerala. Talakaveri stands at a height of 1,276 meters above sea level. Despite its traditional status as the source of the Kaveri, there is no permanent visible flow from this place to the main rivercourse, except during the monsoon rains.

A tank or kundike is erected on a hillside, at the place that is said to be the river's origin. It is also marked by a small temple, and the area is frequented by pilgrims. The river originates as a spring feeding this tank, which is considered to be a holy place to bathe on special days. The waters are then said to flow underground to emerge as the Kaveri river some distance away. The temple has been renovated extensively, most recently in 2007 by the state government.

On Kaveri sankramana (colloquially changrandi) day, the first day of Tula Masa month of the Hindu calendar, which normally falls in mid-October, thousands of pilgrims from neighboring flock to the river's birthplace to witness the rise of the fountainhead, when water gushes up from the spring at a predetermined moment. The day is observed across pilgrim towns on the Kaveri's banks.

Talakaveri is about 8 km (5.0 mi) away from Bhagamandala, 36 km (22 mi) from Panathur (Kerala) and 48 km (30 mi) from Madikeri, the headquarters of Kodagu district.

== Pilgrim center ==
The temple here is dedicated to Goddess Kaveramma or Kaveri. Other deities worshipped here are Lord Agasthiswara, which denotes the link between Kaveri and Sage Agasthya.

The link between Kaveri and Lord Ganesha extends to Srirangam, in Lord Ganesha's role in setting up the Ranganatha temple there.

The temple at Tirumakudalu Narasipura (confluence of Kabini, Kaveri and the legendary Spatika Sarovara) is also dedicated to Agasthiwara.

== History of the temple priests of Talakaveri ==
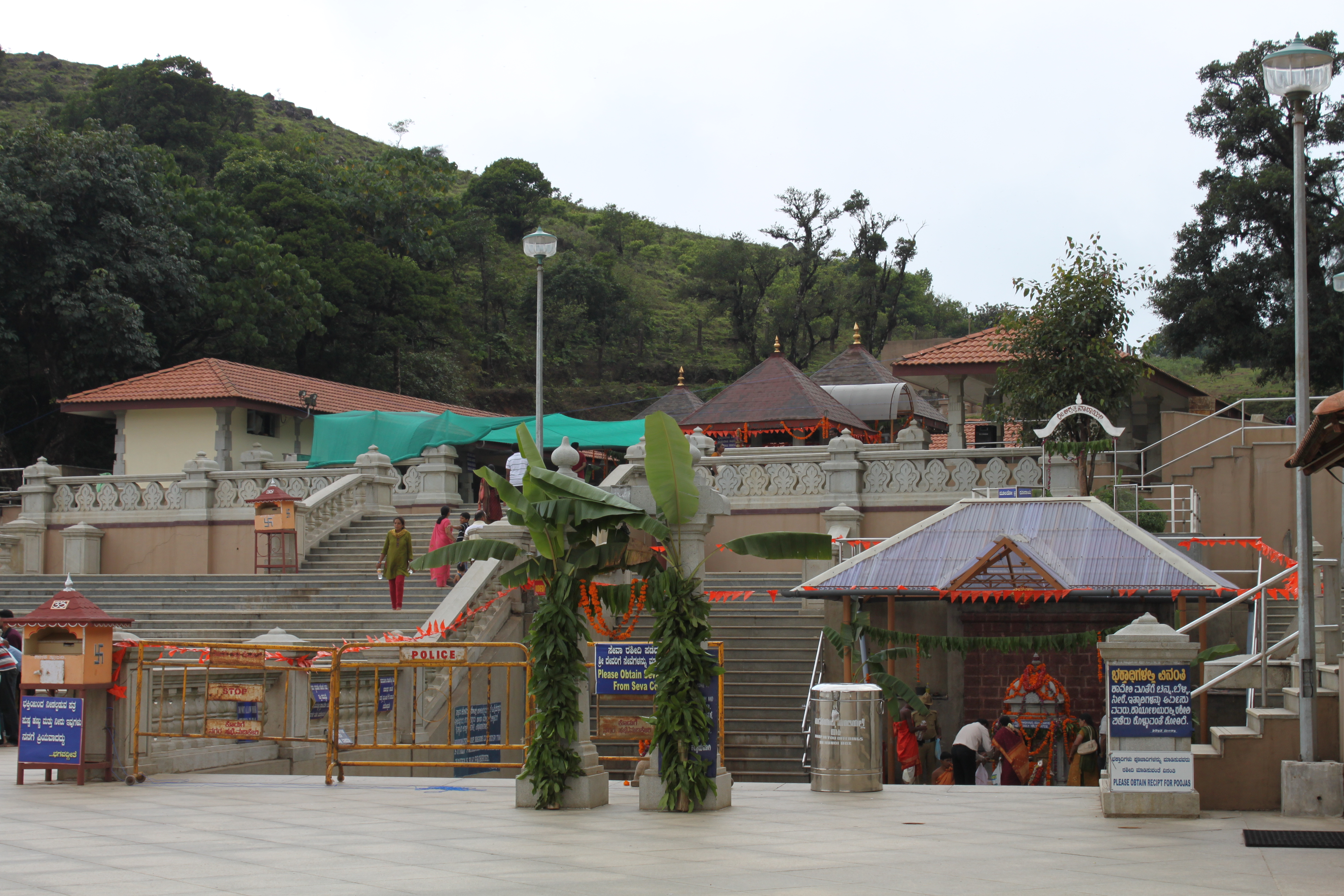
Talakaveri temple after renovation in 2010 by the state government

It is believed that Mayura Varma, and the Kadamba king Narasimman, who ruled vast areas of southern and central India in the 4th Century A.D., brought Brahmins from Ahi Kshetra and put them in charge of various temples in Tulu Nadu.

The Brahmins who first landed in Shivalli in Tulunadu and then spread across 31 villages came to be known as Shivalli Brahmins or Tulu Brahmins. It is from Shivalli and Tulu Brahmins, that the priests of Talakaveri temple have come from.

== Achar Family of Talakaveri ==
The beginning of the Achar family in Talakaveri starts ten generations or about 220 to 240 years ago. A Brahmin named Venkappayya and his two brothers, along with their families came to Talakaveri on a pilgrimage. Lingaraja the First was the ruler of Kodagu from 1780 to 1790 AD. One night God appeared in Lingaraja's dream and indicated that there was a Brahmin family currently visiting Talakaveri. God commanded Lingaraja to appoint this Brahmin to be the priest at the temple. After the king arose from his dream, he sent for this Brahmin family. The king's messengers found Venkappayya in Talakaveri and informed him about the king's desire. Venkappayya accompanied the king's messengers from Talakaveri to Madikeri, a distance of about 24 miles to meet the king.

Lingaraja received Venkappayya and requested him to start daily puja at the temple. The king set up an endowment to pay Venkappayya for his services at the temple. This was the beginning of the Achar family of Talacauvery. The priesthood bestowed by Lingaraja upon Venkappayya has passed on through many generations to his heirs. It is hereditary as most priesthoods are, and all male members of the family have the birthright to become priests at the temple. The current Achars are the ninth generation from Venkappayya.

Venkappayya came from Shivalli Halli (village) of South Canara district. The Brahmins here were called Putturayas, probably meaning priests from Puttur. This Puttur is near Udupi. Venkappayya Putturaya's descendants are the Achars. It is not known why the descendants of Venkappayya took on the surname of Achar. Although Venkappayya came to Talakaveri with his two brothers, only Venkappayya's descendants are documented.

== Nearby ==
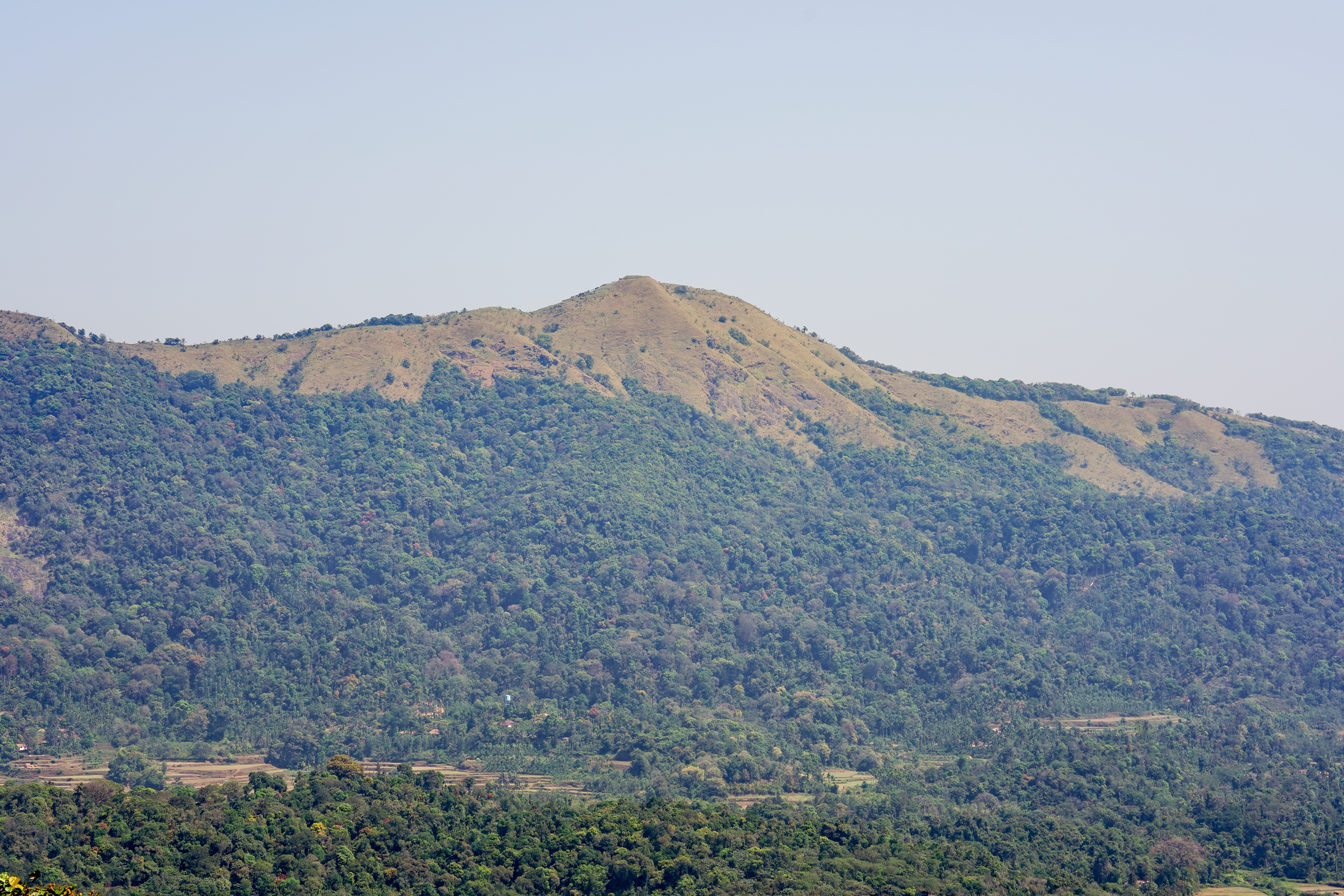
Mountain range to the northwest

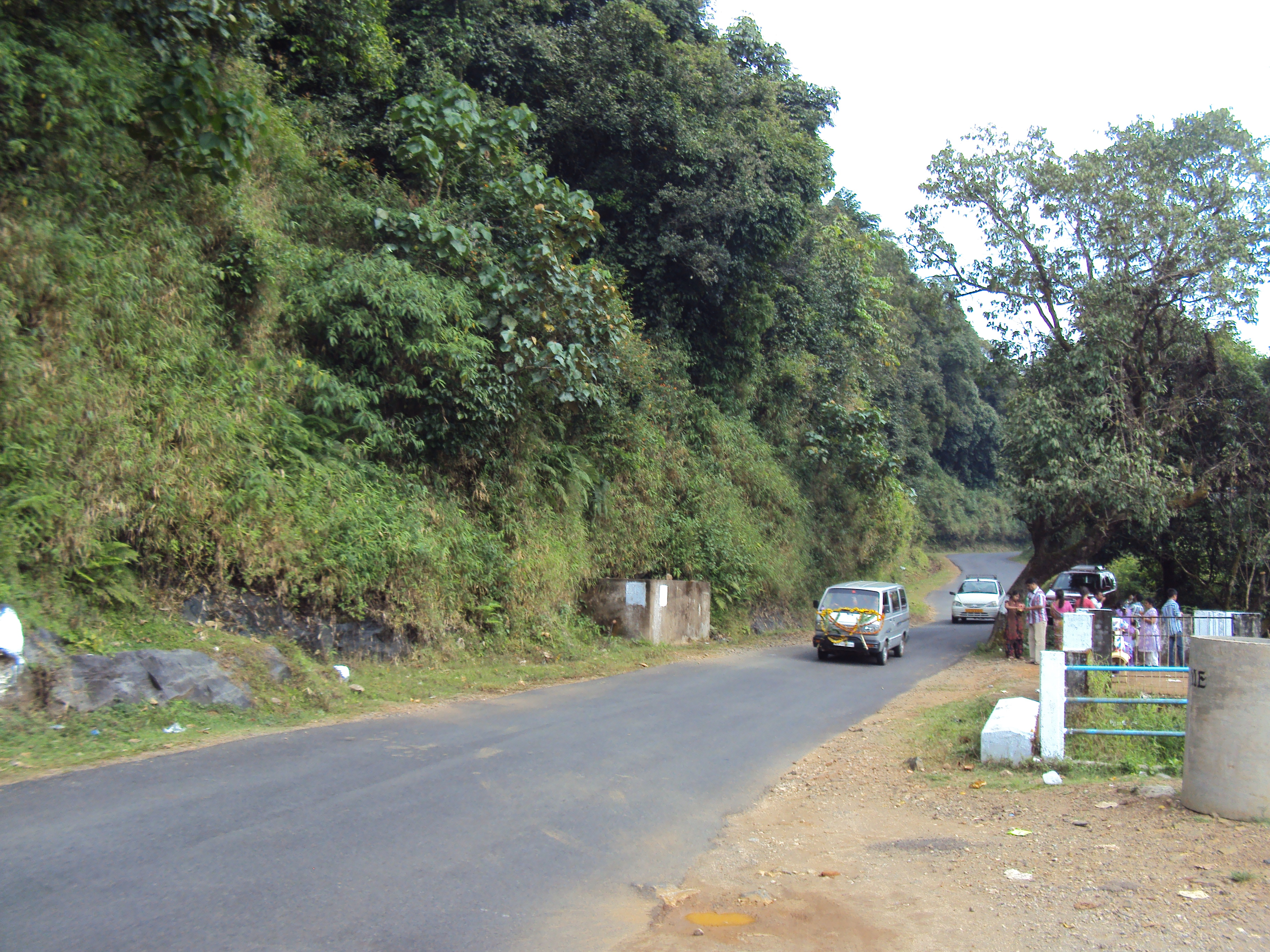
Talakaveri Road

The Brahmagiri hill is situated right beside the temple. There are a series of steps leading to the top of the hill.

From there, one can have a 360 degree view of the surrounding hills. The nearest International Airport is in Kannur at a distance of 117 kilometres (70 mi). The nearest Railway station is in Kanhangad kerala at a distance of 72 kilometres (40 mi).

== Rainfall ==
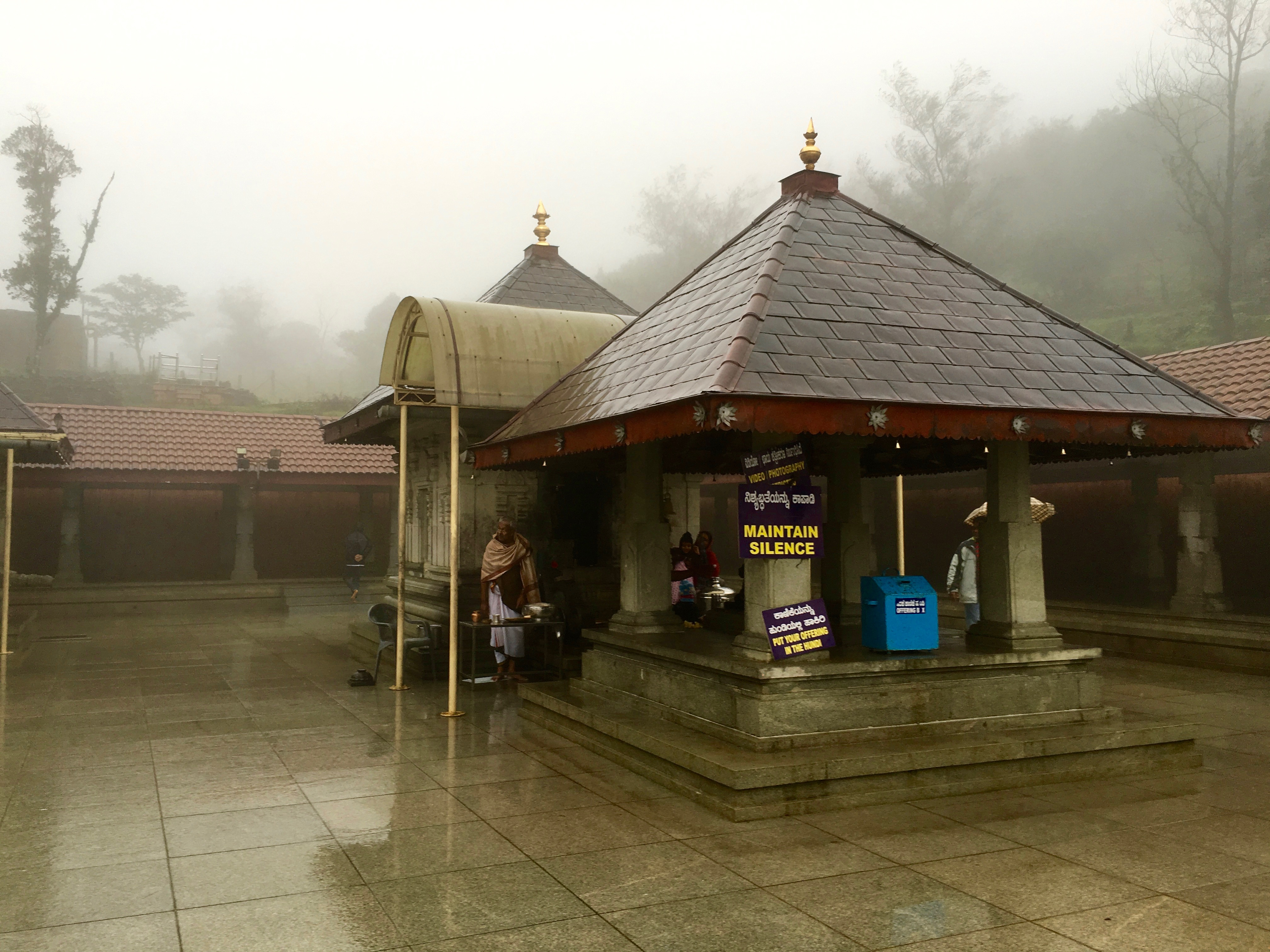
Talakaveri Temple during Monsoon 2016

It is situated in the dense forests of the Western Ghats and gets very heavy annual rainfall of close to 700 cm (280 in). It is among the wettest places in the state of Karnataka.

== Comparisons ==
The table below compares rainfall between Agumbe in Thirthahalli taluk in Shimoga district, Hulikal in Hosanagara taluk in Shimoga district, Amagaon in Khanapur Taluk in Belgaum district and Talacauvery in Madikeri taluk in Kodagu district, Kokalli of Sirsi Taluk, Nilkund of Siddapur Taluk, Castle Rock of Supa (Joida) Taluk in Uttara Kannada District to show which one can be called the "Cherrapunji of South India".

| Year | Talakaveri Rainfall (mm) | Surlabbi Rainfall (mm) | Hulikal Rainfall (mm) | Agumbe Rainfall (mm) | Amagaon Rainfall (mm) | Kokalli Rainfall (mm) | Nilkund Rainfall (mm) | Castle Rock Rainfall (mm) |
|---|---|---|---|---|---|---|---|---|
| 2023 | 4892 | 5299 | 5208 | 5353 | 4389 | | | |
| 2022 | 8763 | 6808 | 7733 | 8122 | 6825 | | | |
| 2021 | 7879 | 6639 | 7937 | 7544 | 6462 | | | 6536 |
| 2020 | 8856 | 5570 | 8401 | 7560 | 7496 | | | 7152 |
| 2019 | 7593 | 5980 | 8541 | 7398 | 9804 | | | 8069 |
| 2018 | 9098 | 9161 | 7577 | 8422 | 6570 | 3944 | 6204 | 6501 |
| 2017 | 5,859 | 5328 | 5,700 | 6,311 | 4,733 | 3130 | 4981 | 5560 |
| 2016 | 5,430 | | 5,721 | 6,449 | 4,705 | 2682 | 4655 | 4968 |
| 2015 | 5,319 | 4135 | 6,035 | 5,518 | 4,013 | 2730 | 4367 | 3667 |
| 2014 | 7,844 | | 7,907 | 7,917 | 5,580 | 8746 | 6710 | 5956 |
| 2013 | 8,628 | 8378 | 9,383 | 8,770 | 8,440 | 4464 | 7082 | 6165 |
| 2012 | 5,722 | 4870 | 8,409 | 6,933 | 5,987 | 5036 | 5398 | 4930 |
| 2011 | 6,855 | 6028 | 8,523 | 7,921 | 9,368 | 4437 | 6593 | 7083 |
| 2010 | 6,794 | 5335 | 7,717 | 6,929 | 10,068 | 4002 | - | 4079 |
| 2009 | - | | 8,357 | 7,982 | - | - | - | - |
| 2008 | - | | 7,115 | 7,199 | - | - | - | - |
| 2007 | - | | 8295 | 8,255 | - | - | - | - |
| 2006 | - | | 8,656 | 8,691 | - | - | - | - |
