= Chelavara Falls =

Waterfall in Karnataka, India

Coordinates: 12°12′22″N 75°40′25″E

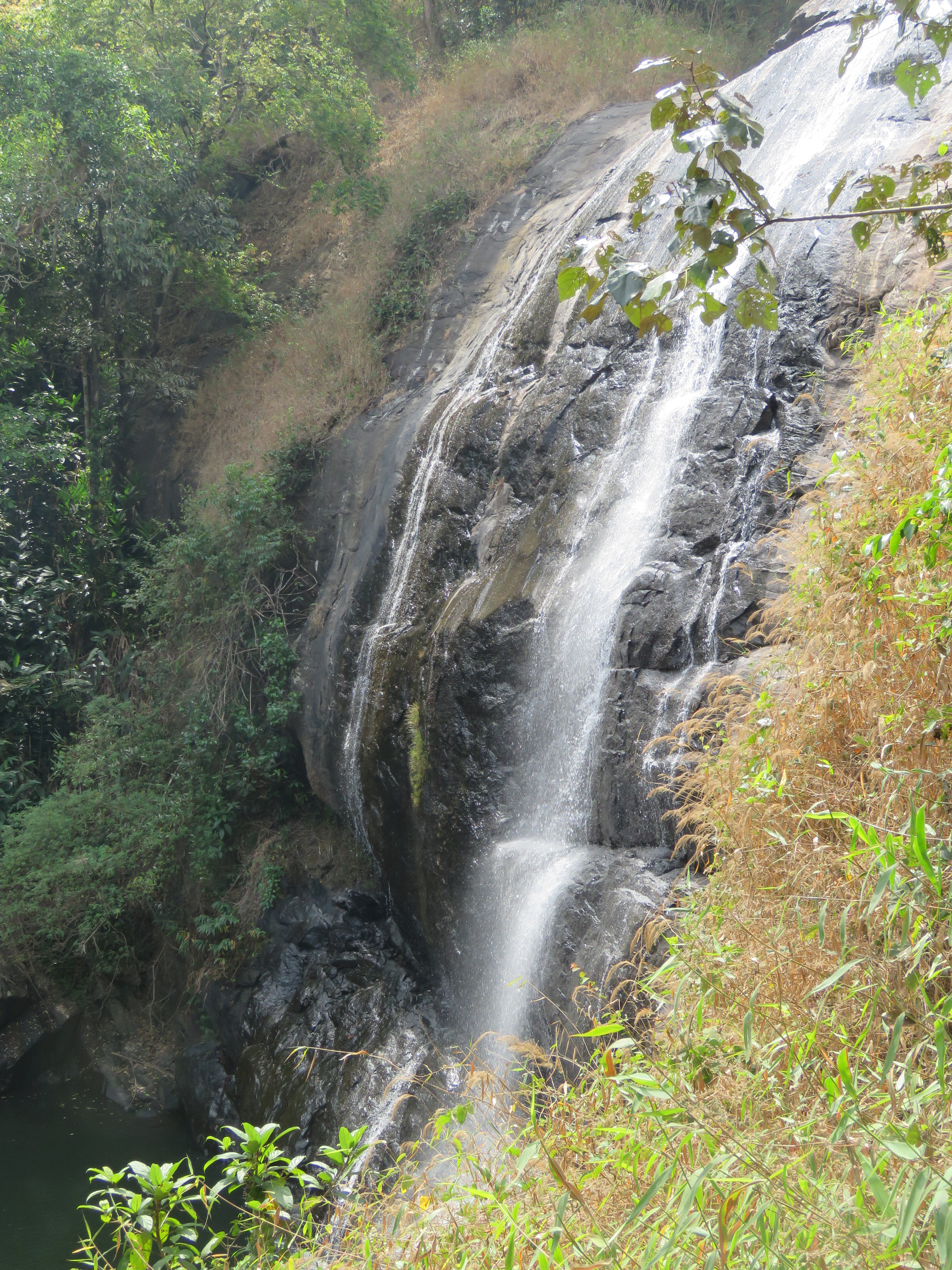
The Chelavara Falls in 2020

Chelvara Falls is a natural waterfall formed by small stream, a tributary of Kaveri near Cheyyandane village which is on Virajpet - Talakaveri State Highway (SH 90) around 16 km from Virajpet, in the state of Karnataka, India.

It is located on the way to Kabbe Holidays Homestay and is near Thadiyandamol, the highest point in Kodagu. The falls is visible after walking 200 meters into the forest from the place available for parking.

One can easily get into dangerous waters and pulled in. It is approximately 100 feet deep. There are danger signs all over. Locals advise not getting into the water. About 20 people have died here.

== See also ==
- List of waterfalls
- List of waterfalls in India
