= Hittalakoppa =

Hittalakoppa is one of the major villages of Siddapura taluk in Karwar District (Karnataka State), India. It is 11 km away from Siddapur and 25 km away from Sagar city, 77 km from the city of Shimoga, 216 km from port city Mangalore and 323 km from state capital Bangalore.

== Geography ==
Hittalakoppa lies in the Western Ghats of India. Nearby villages are Kavanchuru (2 km), Hosahalli (4 km), Arenduru (5 km), Nejjuru (4 km), Sulluru (5 km).

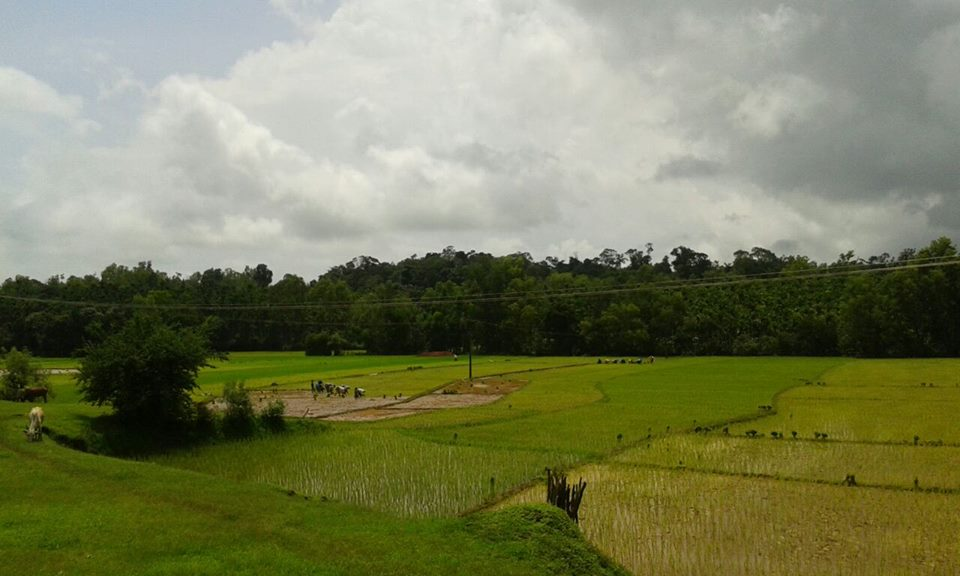
Hittalakoppa

Nearest Places to visit:

- Jog Falls (Around 20 km)
- Kargal (Around 22 km)
- Honnemarudu (Sharavathi Back water; around 15 km)
- Unchalli Falls (around 45 km)
- Keladi (Around 40 km)
- Segandhuru (Around 55 km)
- Bilagi (Historical Place Around 20 km)

== Economy and culture ==
Agriculture is the main source of income for the residents. Land is very fertile and there is abundant water. Areca nut and paddy are the most grown crops.

There are three major temples in this village.

- Shree Maarikaamba temple
- Shree Ganesha temple near Old factory
- Shree Choudeshwari temple
- and few thulasi katte.

Once in 7 years, Maarikaamba fair will be held which is most popular fair in surrounding places. Main festivals of this villages are Mahashivarathri, Ugadi, Aridramale habba (Festival to welcome rain called Aaridra), Chouti (Ganesha festival), Bhoomi Hunnime and Deepavali.

== Transport ==
Talaguppa is the nearest railway station and it is 8 km away. Daily trains are available to reach Bangalore and Mysore city from Talaguppa.

Karnataka State Road Transport Corporation and private bus services are available.
