= Aranthodu =

- village
- Country: India
- State: Karnataka
- District: Dakshina Kannada

Government
  - Body: Gram panchayat

Population (2011)
  - Total: 3,746

Languages
  - Official: Kannada
- Time zone: UTC+5:30 (IST)
- PIN: 574314
- ISO 3166 code: IN-KA
- Vehicle registration: KA
- Nearest city: Sullia
- Lok Sabha constituency: Mangalore

Aranthodu is a village in Sulya Taluk of Dakshina Kannada district in Karnataka. It is located 12 km south of Sullia town, towards Madikeri and Mysore. It is located at a distance of 97 km south-east of Mangalore city.

The village is surrounded with rich water sources which, in fact, prompted its name. 'Aranthodu' is derived from 'aaru thodu' in Kannada, which means six streams. The river Payaswini flows through this village. The village livelihood mainly depends on agriculture/horticulture.

People visiting the Mallikarjuna temple in Thodikana generally take the road heading south from Aranthodu.

Arekannada, Kannada, Tulu and Malayalam are spoken here.
