= Sharavathi LTM Wildlife Sanctuary =

Protected area in Karnataka, India

- IUCN category IV (habitat/species management area)
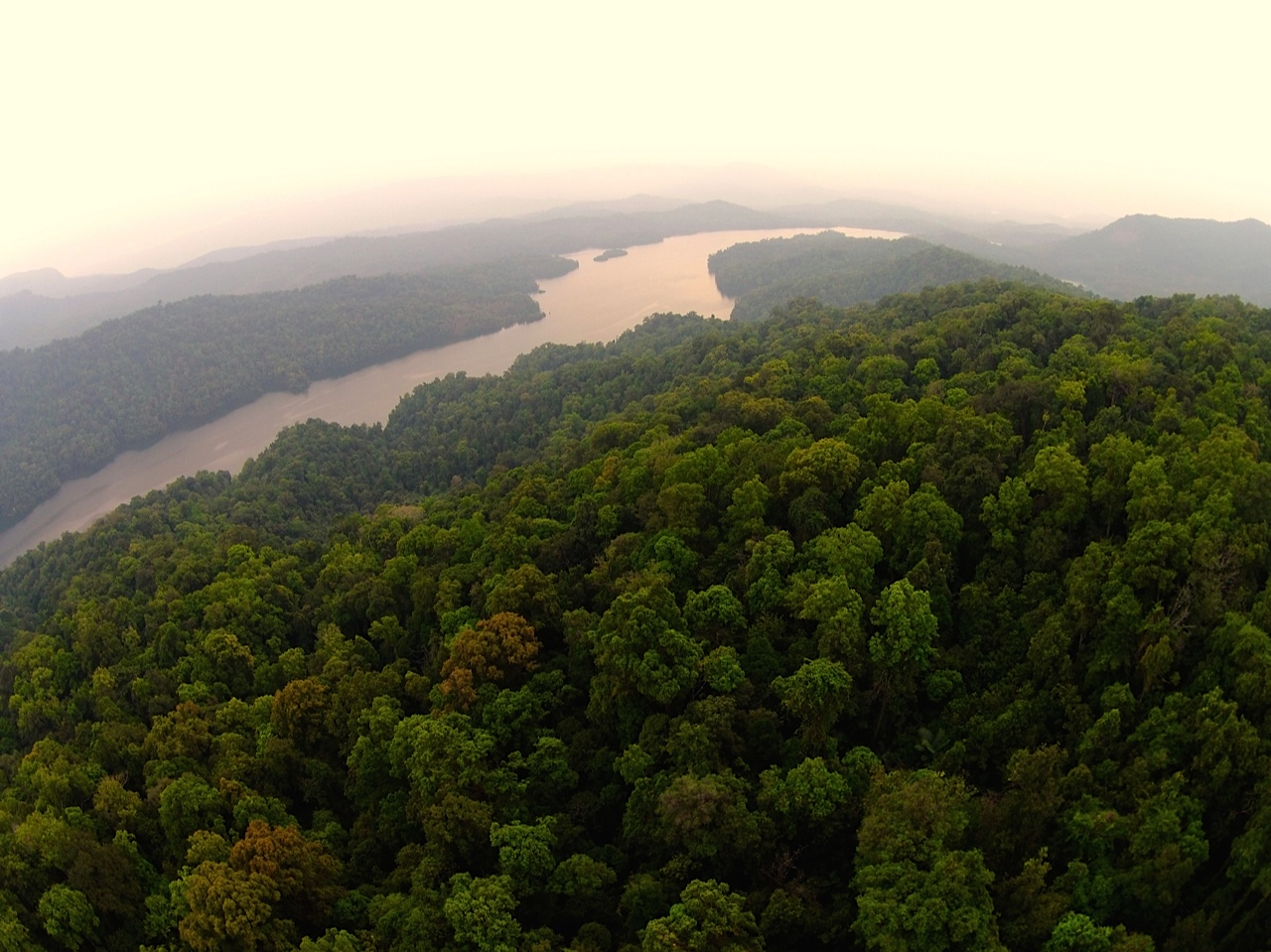
- View of Sharavati Valley

- Location within Karnataka Location within India
- Interactive map of Sharavathi LTM Wildlife Sanctuary
- Location: Shivamogga and Uttara Kannada districts, Karnataka, India
- Nearest city: Sagar, Shivamogga District
- Coordinates: 13°54′N 74°38′E
- Area: 930.16 km^{2} (359.14 sq mi)
- Established: 1972
- Governing body: Shivamogga Wildlife Division, Karnataka Forest Department

Sharavathi Wildlife Sanctuary is a protected wildlife sanctuary in the Western Ghats of Karnataka state in India. It is named after the Sharavathi River flowing through the sanctuary. The sanctuary is spread across the forests of Uttara Kannada & Shivamogga districts of Karnataka, Sharavathi Reservoir is present within the sanctuary. The nearest town Sagara is 34 km away and is connected by bus service to Shivamogga, Hubballi, Mangaluru and Bengaluru on a daily basis. The nearest railway station Thalaguppa is 15 Km away, while the nearest airport viz. Shivamogga is located about 80 Km from the sanctuary.

The sanctuary was established in 1972 with an area of 431.23 km^{2} (166.50 sq mi) vide gazette notification "No.AFD-22-FWL-74, dated: 28-06-1978".

It was subsequently expanded to 930.16 km^{2} (359.14 sq mi) in the year 2019. The sanctuary was expanded by adding the Aghanashini Lion Tailed Macaque Conservation Reserve (299.52 km^{2} (115.65 sq mi)) and some of the reserved forests (200 km^{2} (77 sq mi)) in Uttara Kannada & Shivamogga districts, to the existing sanctuary. After expansion, the sanctuary has been renamed as the Sharavathi Lion Tailed Macaque Wildlife Sanctuary.

The expanded sanctuary is aimed at protecting the freshwater habitat of Myristica swamps that hosts many species like Lion Tailed Macaque, Leaf Nosed Bats, Hornbills etc.

Lion Tailed Macaque (Macaca silenus) is classified as "Endangered" by IUCN.

== Flora and fauna ==
The Sharavathi Wildlife Sanctuary has Southern Tropical Evergreen Type, Southern Tropical Semi-evergreen Forest etc.

The sanctuary has fauna like Spotted Deer, Sambar, Gaur, Indian wild boar, Indian Porcupine, Muntjac (Barking Deer), Mouse Deer, Lion Tailed Macaque, Common Langur, Tiger, Panther, Dhole, Python, King Cobra etc. Grey Jungle Fowl, Peacocks, Wood peckers, Fly Catchers, King Fisher, Whistling Teal, Bulbuls, Myna, Bee Eaters, Drango are some of the birds found in the sanctuary.
