= Devaragundi =

Waterfall in Karnataka, India

Coordinates: 12.475°N 75.479°E

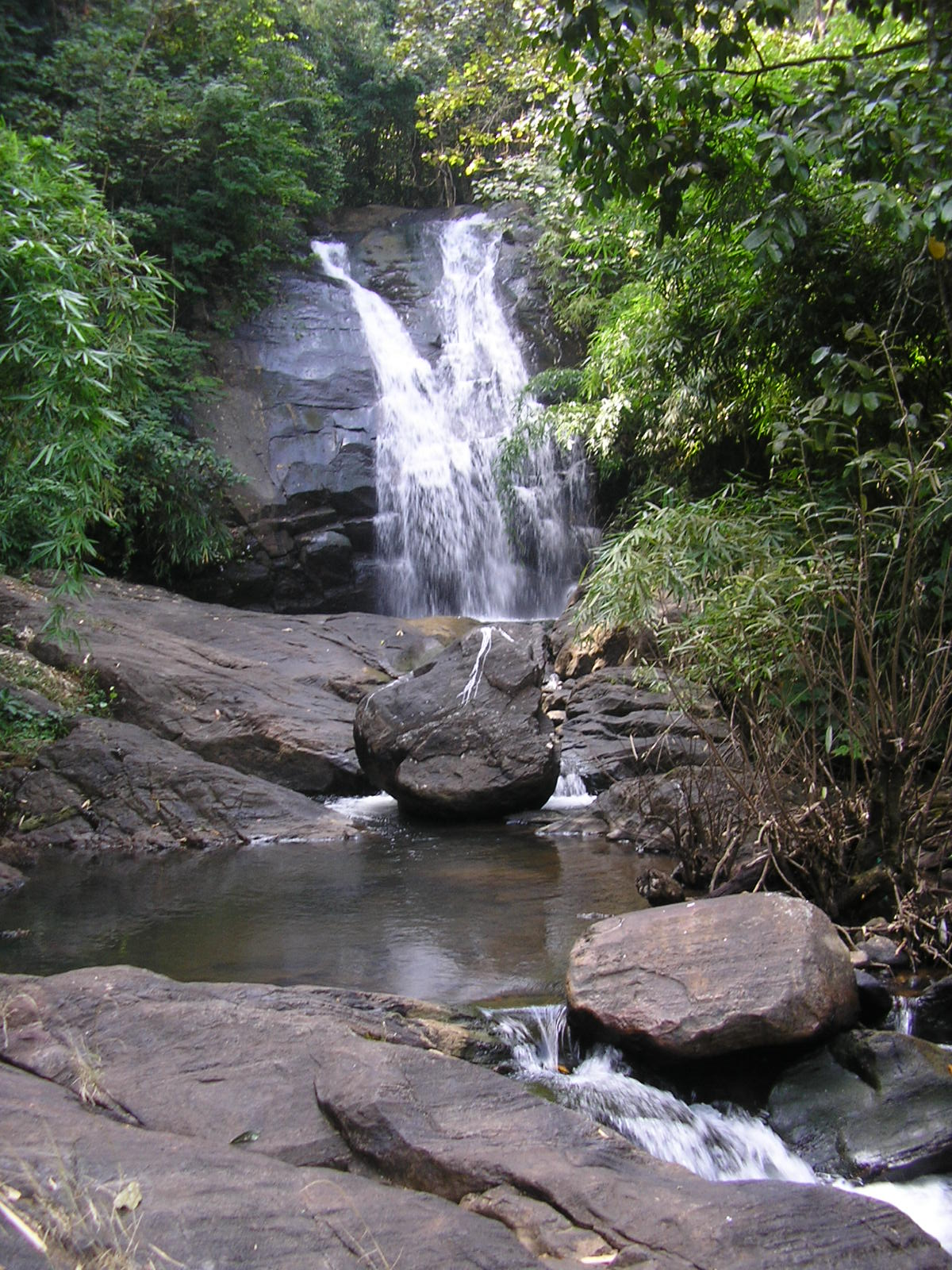

Devaragundi, meaning 'God's pool', is a waterfall in India. It is created by one of the mountain streams at Thodikana. It can be reached by going further for about 1.5 kilometres from Sri Mallikarjuna Temple towards the Patti Hills. One must cross two streams, climb uphill, and walk through a private arecanut farm to view this magnificent waterfall. It is cautioned that no one should step into the water in the surrounding of the waterfall, as its depth is unknown.

Due to its sacredness, it has been away from human activities.

== See also ==
- List of waterfalls
- List of waterfalls in India
- Sullia
- Mangalore
