= Nilkund =

- Village
- Nickname: Cheerapunji of Uttara Kannada
- Location in Karnataka, India
- Coordinates: 14.4548°N 74.7003°E
- Country: India
- Taluk: Siddapura
- District: Uttara Kannada
- Elevation: 545 m (1,788 ft)

Population (2011)
  - Total: 247

Languages
  - Official: Kannada
- Time zone: UTC+5:30 (IST)
- Vehicle registration: KA-31
- Literacy: 85.65%

Nilkund or Nilkunda is a village in Siddapura taluk in Uttara Kannada District in Karnataka State. Nilkund is known for its abundant rainfall in Uttara Kannada District. At an average, this village receives over 6000 mm of rainfall per year.

The village lies on the western Ghats. It has several attractions including Vatehalla waterfall and bheemana gudda (Bheemanavaare) nearby. Also it hosts ancient Shri Veerabhadra temple which is re-innovated in 2021. A much popular Unchalli waterfall is also about 8 km from here.

Climate data for Nilkund
Month	Jan	Feb	Mar	Apr	May	Jun	Jul	Aug	Sep	Oct	Nov	Dec	Year
Average rainfall mm (inches)	3 (0.1)	5 (0.2)	0 (0)	6 (0.2)	75 (3.0)	1,779 (70.0)	3,410 (134.3)	1,139 (44.8)	572 (22.5)	93 (3.7)	0 (0)	0 (0)	7,082 (278.8)
Average rainy days	1	1	0	1	5	28	31	27	19	8	0	0	121
