= Shettihalli Wildlife Sanctuary =

Wildlife sanctuary in Karnataka, India

Coordinates: 13°51′00″N 75°26′20″E

- IUCN category IV (habitat/species management area)
- Location within Karnataka Location within India
- Interactive map of Shettihalli Wildlife Sanctuary
- Location: Shimoga district, Karnataka, India
- Established: 1974

Shettihalli Wildlife Sanctuary is a wildlife sanctuary in the state of Karnataka, India. It was declared a wildlife sanctuary on 23 November 1974.

Featuring a variety of flora and fauna, Shettihalli Wildlife Sanctuary is situated in the Shimoga district of Karnataka. The sanctuary is home to species of animals such as white-backed vultures, Indian nightjar, and white-bellied dingo. Some other animal species such as tigers, king cobra, sloth bears, leopards, elephants, langurs, and pythons reside in dense forest areas.

== Location ==
Shettihalli Wildlife Sanctuary spans over an area of 395.6 km^{2} (152.7 sq mi). It is divided into three areas or zones, namely the core zone, the buffer zone and the tourism zone. It is situated 30 km away from Teerthahalli. Mangalore International Airport is the closest airport and Shimoga Railway Station is the closest railhead to Shettihalli Wildlife Sanctuary. The famous Jog Falls is also located near this sanctuary.
