= Hulikal =

- Village
- Location in Karnataka, India
- Coordinates: 13.731°N 75.015°E
- Country: India
- State: Karnataka
- District: Shimoga
- Taluk: Hosanagara
- Elevation: 644 m (2,113 ft)

Languages
  - Official: Kannada
- Time zone: UTC+5:30 (IST)

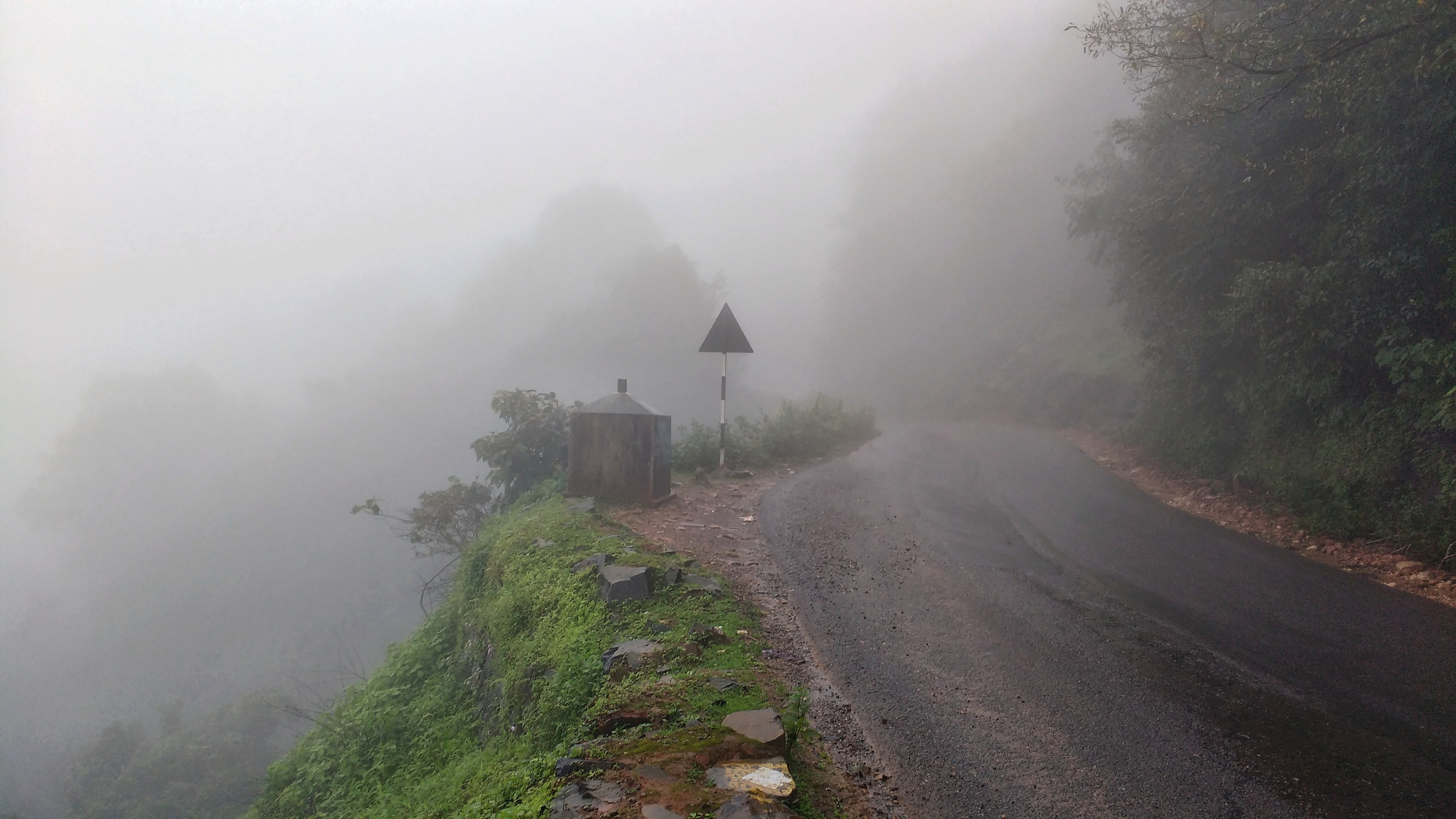
Hulikal Ghat – The road in the picture connects Kundapur and other towns in Shivamogga district.

Hulikal is a village located in the Hosanagara taluk of the Shimoga district in the Indian state of Karnataka and is known for its heavy rainfall. The Hulikal village lies in the Western Ghats (Pashchima ghattagalu in Kannada) region of Karnataka state. The range of ghat is known by the name Hulikal ghat or Balebare ghat. The road running between Hosangadi and Mastikatte through Hulikal ghati connects the coastal district of Udupi with Shivamogga (Shimoga) district. The Mani dam reservoir and Savehoklu reservoir are nearby. KPCL has its colony at Mastikatte near to Hulikal. The nearest airport is at Mangalore, situated 123 km south-west of Hulikal. It has an elevation of 600m.

== Climate ==
Hulikal experiences an extremely wet tropical monsoon climate (Am) under the Köppen climate classification. It has little to no rainfall from December to April and heavy to extremely heavy rainfall from May to November.

Climate data for Hulikal
Month	Jan	Feb	Mar	Apr	May	Jun	Jul	Aug	Sep	Oct	Nov	Dec	Year
Mean daily maximum °C (°F)	29.3 (84.7)	30.5 (86.9)	31.9 (89.4)	32.0 (89.6)	30.9 (87.6)	26.7 (80.1)	25.0 (77.0)	25.2 (77.4)	26.4 (79.5)	27.8 (82.0)	28.5 (83.3)	28.7 (83.7)	28.6 (83.4)
Mean daily minimum °C (°F)	16.3 (61.3)	17.3 (63.1)	19.5 (67.1)	21.5 (70.7)	21.9 (71.4)	20.8 (69.4)	20.4 (68.7)	20.3 (68.5)	20.0 (68.0)	19.9 (67.8)	18.2 (64.8)	16.5 (61.7)	19.4 (66.9)
Average rainfall mm (inches)	0 (0)	0 (0)	2 (0.1)	18 (0.7)	142 (5.6)	1,728 (68.0)	2,835 (111.6)	2,230 (87.8)	674 (26.5)	290 (11.4)	73 (2.9)	15 (0.6)	8,007 (315.2)
Source 1: Directorate of Economics and Statistics, Karnataka
Source 2: Climate-Data.org

== Rainfall ==
It is situated in the dense forests of the Western Ghats. Over the past few years it has surpassed the rainfall record held by Agumbe in Tirthahalli taluk, also in Shimoga district to be arguably called the 'rain capital' of Karnataka.

However, rainfall in Amagaon near Khanapur in Belgaum District has reached the figure of 10,000 mm annual rainfall twice from 2006 to 2011. Also, Amagaon has received more rain than Agumbe and Hulikal three times from 2006 to 2011.

== Comparisons ==
The table below compares rainfall between Agumbe in Thirthahalli taluk in Shimoga district, Hulikal in Hosanagara taluk in Shimoga district, Amagaon in Khanapur Taluk in Belgaum district and Talacauvery in Madikeri taluk in Kodagu district, Kerekatte of Sringeri Taluk in Chikmagalur District, Nilkund of Siddapur Taluk in Uttara Kannada district and Kollur of Kundapur Taluk in Udupi district to show which one can be called the "Cherrapunji of South India".

Year	Hulikal Rainfall (mm)	Agumbe Rainfall (mm)	Amagaon Rainfall (mm)	Talacauvery Rainfall (mm)	Kerekatte Rainfall (mm)	Nilkund Rainfall (mm)	Kollur Rainfall (mm)
2024	8606	8639					
2023	5208	5353	4389	4892	4807		
2022	7733	8122	6825	8763	6891		5296
2021	7937	7544	6462	7879	6910		5727
2020	8401	7560	7496	8856	6562		6874
2019	8541	7398	9804	7593	7281		7410
2018	7577	8422	6570	9098	8463	6204	7403
2017	5,700	6,311	4,733	5,859	5,500	4,981	5,203
2016	5,721	6,449	4,705	5,430	5,265	4,655	3,496
2015	6,035	5,518	4,013	5,319	5,013	4,367	4,254
2014	7,907	7,917	5,580	7,844	6,334	6,710	6054
2013	9,383	8,770	8,440	8,628	7,460	7,082	6,614
2012	8,409	6,933	5,987	5,722	5,839	5,398	6,715
2011	8,523	7,921	9,368	6,855	6,826	6,593	7,083
2010	7,717	6,929	10,068	6,794	5,332	5,648	7,685
2009	8,357	7,982	-	-	-	-	-
2008	7,115	7,199	-	-	-	-	-
2007	8295	8,255	-	-	-	-	-
2006	8,656	8,691	-	-	-	-	-
