= Siddapur Taluk =

Taluk in Karnataka, India

- Taluk
- Map of Siddapur Taluk
- Location in Karnataka, India
- Coordinates: 14.347°N 74.894°E
- Country: India
- State: Karnataka
- Region: Malenadu
- District: Uttara Kannada
- Headquarter: Siddapura
- Elevation: 564 m (1,850 ft)

Population (2011)
  - Total: 97,322

Languages
  - Official: Kannada
  - Dialect: Sirsi Kannada
- Time zone: UTC+5:30 (IST)
- PIN: 581 355
- Telephone code: 08389
- Vehicle registration: KA 31 Sirsi

Siddapur or Siddhapura Taluk is the destination of world famous Jog Falls. It is a part of Uttara Kannada district, Karnataka, India and is located in the midst of forest areas of Western Ghats and it is also a part of Malenadu. The taluk is full of greenery, hills and arecanut gardens developed in the valleys’. The taluk headquarters is Siddapur. Sirsi is the nearest city,

== Demography ==
As of 2001 India census, the main town Siddapur had a population of 14,049. Males constitute 51% of the population and females 49% and has an average literacy rate of 82%, higher than the national average of 59.5%: male literacy is 88%, and female literacy is 82%. In Siddapur, 11% of the population is under 6 years of age.pure Kannada is the widely spoken language which includes [Havyaka] a sub language of Kannada and other language spoken is Konkani.

== Economy ==
Siddapur taluk is full of forests and hills and arecanut is mainly grown in the valleys in between forests. The other crops grown are arecanuts, paddy, coconut, pineapple, pepper, vanilla etc. Coffee is also grown in certain pockets of the Taluk. Industrial activity is minimal and restricted to a small number of Rice mills, supari manufacturing units etc.

== Transport ==
Siddapur Taluk is connected by road only, and the main means of transport are the state-owned KSRTC and certain private bus companies. The Taluk headquarters and villages of the taluk are connected by road to Karwar, Sirsi, Kumta, Bhatkal, Sagar, Shimoga, Bangalore, Mysore, Hubli, etc.

The nearest railway station is Talaguppa (18 km) towards Shimoga, Mysore, Bangalore, Chennai, Hydrabad and Kumta (68 km) towards Karwar, Goa, Mumbai, Pune, Mangalore and Kerala. Nearest airport is Hubli Airport towards Bangalore and Mumbai, which is about 120 km. from Siddapur.

== Art and culture ==
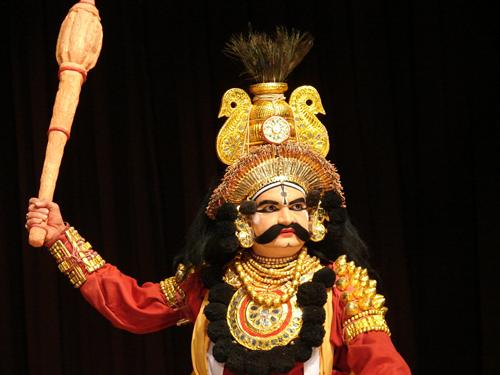
Yakshagana artist with Kirita depicts King

All over Siddapur Taluk, Yakshagana, a classical dance drama popular in the state of Karnataka, is practiced regularly and 'badagu thittu' form of the art has its own style in entire Uttara Kannada district.

Some festivals are celebrated in different ways. "Holi Hunnive" also known as "Kamana Habba" is celebrated on full moon day. Effigies/statues of Rati and Manmatha are placed at different places on the 14th day, i.e. Chaturdashi and burnt on Poornina, Full Moon day and people bathe in colour waters. Deepawali - festivals of lights is celebrated with people burning torches made of long -soft wood called "Pundi kattu" and hoisting paper made lanterns called "Aakaash Butti". main festival is actually ganesh chaturti and deepavali of Hindu religion.

== Religious places ==
=== Temples ===
Kondli Sri Marikamba Temple Situated at Haladakatta, Siddapur and Kondli Sri Kalikamba Temple, Sri Vinayak Temple Honnegundi, Sri Renukamba Temple Chandragutti (15 km from Siddapur), Shri Shaneshwara temple and Hanuman Temple Bedkani (5 km from Siddapur), Sri Bhuvaneshwari Temple Bhuvanagiri are very old and famous temples here. Further Sri Laxmi-Venkatesh Temple, Sri Vittal-Rukmini Mandir, Sringeri sri sharadha Temple Hosuru, Sri Shiv Mandir also situated here.

The famous 'Marikamba Jaathre' held on Maribail Kondli, commemorating the goddess Marikamba is held by the temple authorities once in every 5 year. Nearly a lakh devotees from all parts of the country attend the fair, making it one of the biggest festivals in the region. In the heart of the town there are three more temples one Sri Ganapati Temple, one Maruti Temple newar Chandraghatgati Patanganaa and one Shiva Temple which is very old and dilapidated condition. The Ganapati Temple has a stone inscription which depicts the history of the temple.

Basavanna (Bull) Temple is located in the heart of Siddapura Town. Every year grand Jatra (annual fair) festival will be held during Magha Hunnime ( Normally comes in the month of February). People all across villages of the Siddapur taluk and neighbour taluk arrive for this Jatra.

=== Mosques ===
Jamiya Masjid is located in Siddapur, the taluk headquarters.

=== Churches ===
Holy Rosary Catholic Church, Ravindranagar is situated in Ravindranagar, Siddapur.

=== Mutt ===
Sri Murughamutt, a Veerashaiva - Lingayat Mutt is located in Basavanna Galli, Siddapur, the taluk headquarters.

== Banking/Finance facilities ==
Several villages and taluk headquarters have banking facilities of Nationalized Banks and certain financial institutions are also functioning in the taluk.

== Special sweet dishes in Siddapur ==
Jack-fruit and banana chips, Fresh Sugarcane juice are special. Kadubu: The main ingredients are jackfruit pulp and jaggery. The batter is prepared and with some additional ingredients, the batter is put into a container and steamed. The dessert is a local delicacy and is served hot with ghee.

Holge: Well these are not similar to pancakes but one could say that these are the sweet equivalents of tortillas. One variant is made with gram flour and jaggery while the other is made with coconuts.

Todadevu : It is a special kind of thin crust dosa made out of jaggery/sugarcane juice.

== Villages ==
- Kondli
- Charekone
- Kavanchuru , @ Kavachuru
- Hittalakoppa
