= Amagaon =

- Village
- Location in Karnataka, India Amagaon (India)
- Coordinates: 15.6321°N 74.295502°E
- Country: India
- State: Karnataka
- District: Belagavi District
- Taluks: Khanapur
- Elevation: 785 m (2,575 ft)

Languages
  - Official: Kannada
- Time zone: UTC+5:30 (IST)

Amagaon is a village in Belagavi district bordered by Goa in west in the southern state of Karnataka, India. Amagaon nestles in the dense forests of the Western Ghats in and is known for its heavy rainfall. It is known to get over 10,000 mm annual rainfall occasionally and the average annual rainfall is around 9,000 mm. It is also called as Cherrapunji of Southern India.

Amagaon has reached the magical figure of 10,068 mm annual rainfall twice in the last six years (2006–11). Thrice in the last six year (2006–11), Amagaon has received more rain than Agumbe and Hulikal.

A comparison of rainfalls for between Agumbe, Hulikal and Amagaon for the " Cherrapunji of South India " title is given in Table 1.

The table below is comparison of rainfalls for between Agumbe in Thirthahalli taluk in Shimoga district, Hulikal in Hosanagara taluk in Shimoga district, Amagaon, Talacauvery in Madikeri taluk in Kodagu district to show which one can be called the "Cherrapunji of South India".

Year	Amagaon Rainfall (mm)	Hulikal Rainfall (mm)	Agumbe Rainfall (mm)	Talacauvery Rainfall (mm)
2016	4,705	5,721	6,449	5,430
2015	4,013	6,035	5,518	5,319
2014	5,580	7,907	7,917	7,844
2013	8,440	9,383	8,770	8,628
2012	5,987	8,409	6,933	5,722
2011	9,368	8,523	7,921	6,855
2010	10,068	7,717	6,929	6,794
2009	-	8,357	7,982	-
2008	-	7,115	7,199	-
2007	-	9,038	8,255	-
2006	-	8,656	8,457	-

Note: Amagaon has got over 10,000 mm annual rainfall twice in the five years (2006–2010). The exact amount of rainfall is not available.
