= Siddapura, Uttara Kannada =

Town in Karnataka

Siddapur
- Town
- Location in Karnataka, India Siddapur (India)
- Coordinates: 14.347°N 74.894°E
- Country: India
- State: Karnataka
- Region: Malenadu
- District: Uttara Kannada
- Elevation: 564 m (1,850 ft)

Population (2011)
  - Total: 14,204

Languages
  - Official: Kannada
- Time zone: UTC+5:30 (IST)
- PIN: 581 355
- Telephone code: +91-8389
- ISO 3166 code: IN-KA
- Vehicle registration: KA 31 Sirsi
- Website: siddapuratown.mrc.gov.in

Siddapura or Sidddhapura is a town and the headquarters of Siddapur taluk in Uttara Kannada district, Karnataka. It is known for its proximity to Jog Falls which is in Sagar Taluk.

== Demographics ==
Religion in Siddapur Taluk
| | Percent |
| Hinduism | 95.0% |
| Islam | 4.0% |
| Christianity | 0.5% |
| Jainism | 0.5% |
| Others† | 0.00% |
Distribution of religions

As of 2001, Siddapur had a population of 14,049. Males were 51% of the population and females 49%. The average literacy rate is 82% (male 88%, female 82%). 11% of the population is under 6 years of age. Kannada is the most common language.

== Transport ==
Map of Siddapur Taluk

Bus service is provided by KSRTC and a few private bus operators. These buses connect Siddapur to elsewhere in Karnataka, as well as a few buses to other states. Siddapur is well connected by road to the surrounding area.

The nearest railway station is along the South Western Railway in Talaguppa (18 km/11 mi away). The nearest airport is Hubli Airport, about 120 kilometres (75 mi) from Siddapur.

== Economy ==
The main occupation of the residents of Siddapur is agriculture, primarily areca nut cultivation. In addition to areca nut, commodities like rice, coffee, pineapple, cardamom, coconut, pepper and vanilla are also grown. Other industries include soda making, ice cream making, pineapple juice factories, jackfruit chip mills and banana chip mills.

== Culture ==
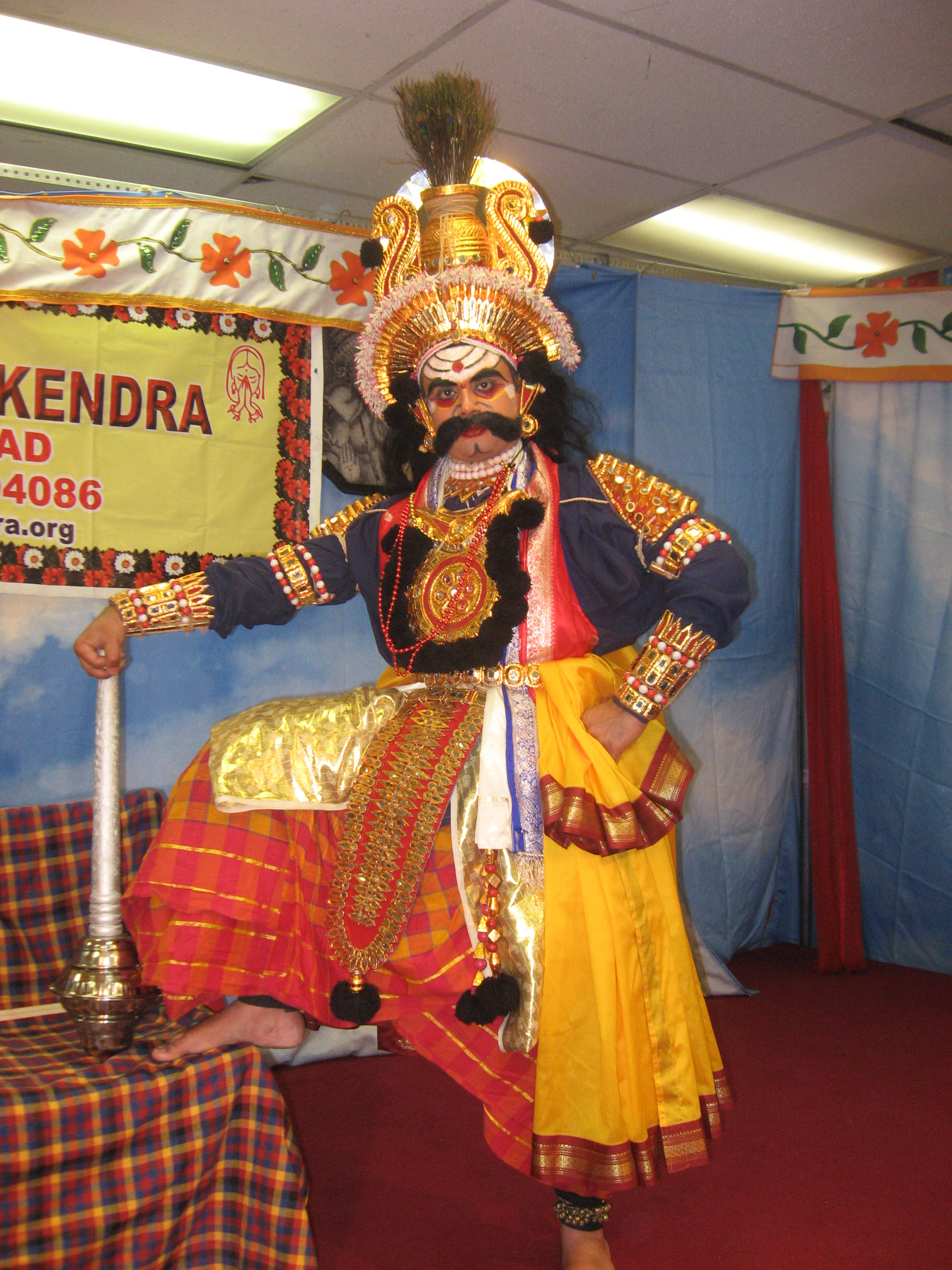
Yakshagana artist with Kirita

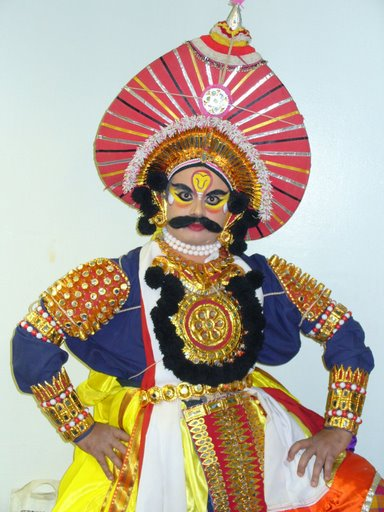
Yakshagana artist with Kedige

Yakshagana (Kannada: ಯಕ್ಷಗಾನ) is a classical form of dance drama popular throughout the coastal districts of Karnataka.

=== Religion ===
Siddapur is home to many Hindu temples. The Hindu festival Marikamba is celebrated every five years. This festival commemorates the goddess Marikamba, a form of Durga. Over 100,000 people attend this festival, making it one of the largest in the region. Other festivals include Basaveshwar Jaatre held annually in February and Shanishwar held annually in March. Siddapur has the one and only temple to Karnataka Naada Devi Bhuvaneshwari at Bhuvangiri on the Kumta Road. Every year, during Kannada Rajyotsava, JayaKarnataka, a pro-Kannada organization, visits the temple and celebrates Kannada Rajyotsava.

Two Sunni mosques are located in Siddapur, Badriya Jamia Masjid and Bedkani Jamia Masjid, and a church, the Holy Rosary Catholic Church, is located in the Ravindranagar neighborhood.

=== Cuisine ===
- Jackfruit chips,
- banana chips,
- sugarcane juice,
- Kadubu, a steamed dessert made of jackfruit pulp and jaggery, served with hot ghee (clarified butter),
- Holge, a sweet tortilla, made with gramflour and jaggery, or with coconut,
- Todadevu, a special kind of thin crust dosa made of sugarcane juice or fresh honey,
- Koli Kajjaya, made of rice flour fried in oil, using roti and served with thick potato sambar or country chicken curry (soup),
- Hosagere Kajjaya, made of rice flour fried in oil, using roti and served with thick potato sambar or country chicken curry (soup),
- Kotte Kadabu, made of fermented rice paste steam boiled in banana leaf packets for about four hours, it tastes great with chicken curry (soup), mutton curry (soup), coconut chutney, fish curry (soup), prawn (shrimp) curry (soup) and sambar (vegetable stew),
- Appe Huli, a kind of raw mango curry (soup).
