= Honnemaradu =

Village and lake in Karnataka, India

Coordinates: 14.178146°N 74.876289°E

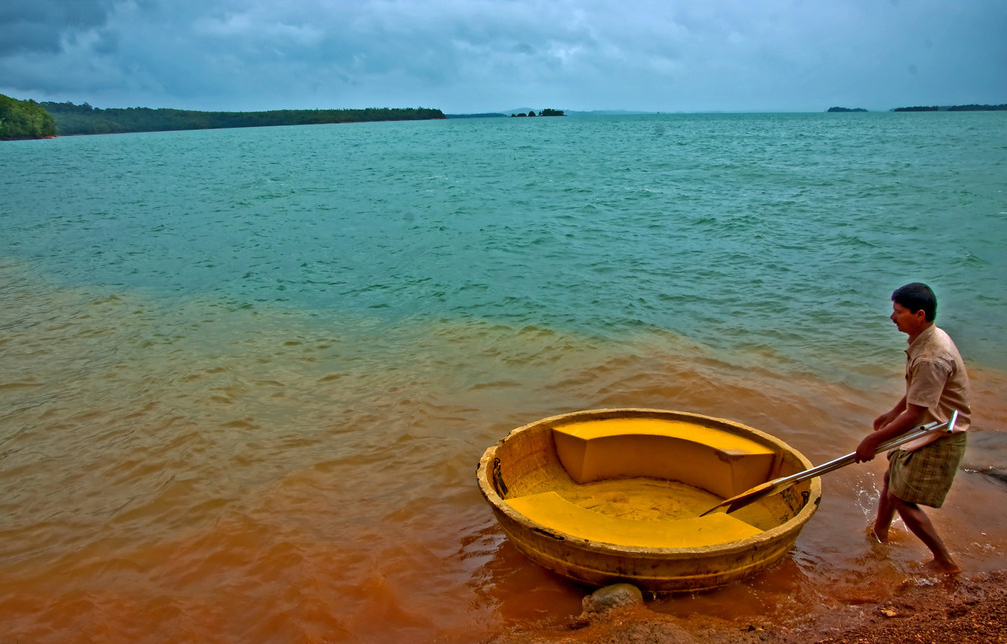
Boat ride in Honnemaradu

Honnemaradu is a village situated on the back waters of River Sharavathi in India. Honnemardu derived its name from the Honne tree. However, the literal meaning of Honnemardu is Golden Lake.

It is in Sagara taluk, Karnataka about 35 km from Sagara on the way to Jog Falls, 12 km from Talaguppa and 392 km from Bangalore.

== Notable landmarks ==
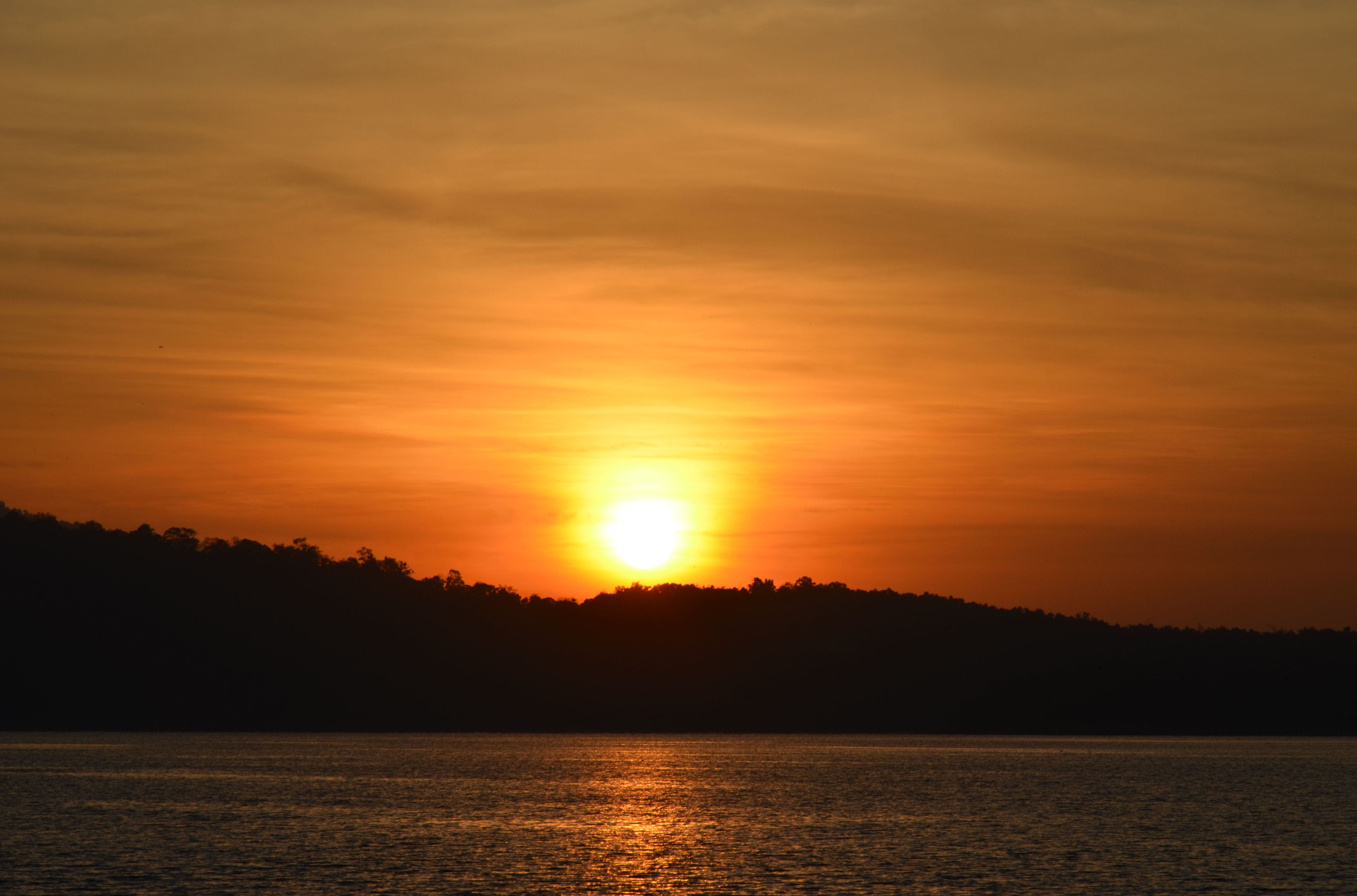
Sunrise at Honnemaradu

Honnemaradu is a small village located on the hills that overlook the Linganamakki Reservoir.

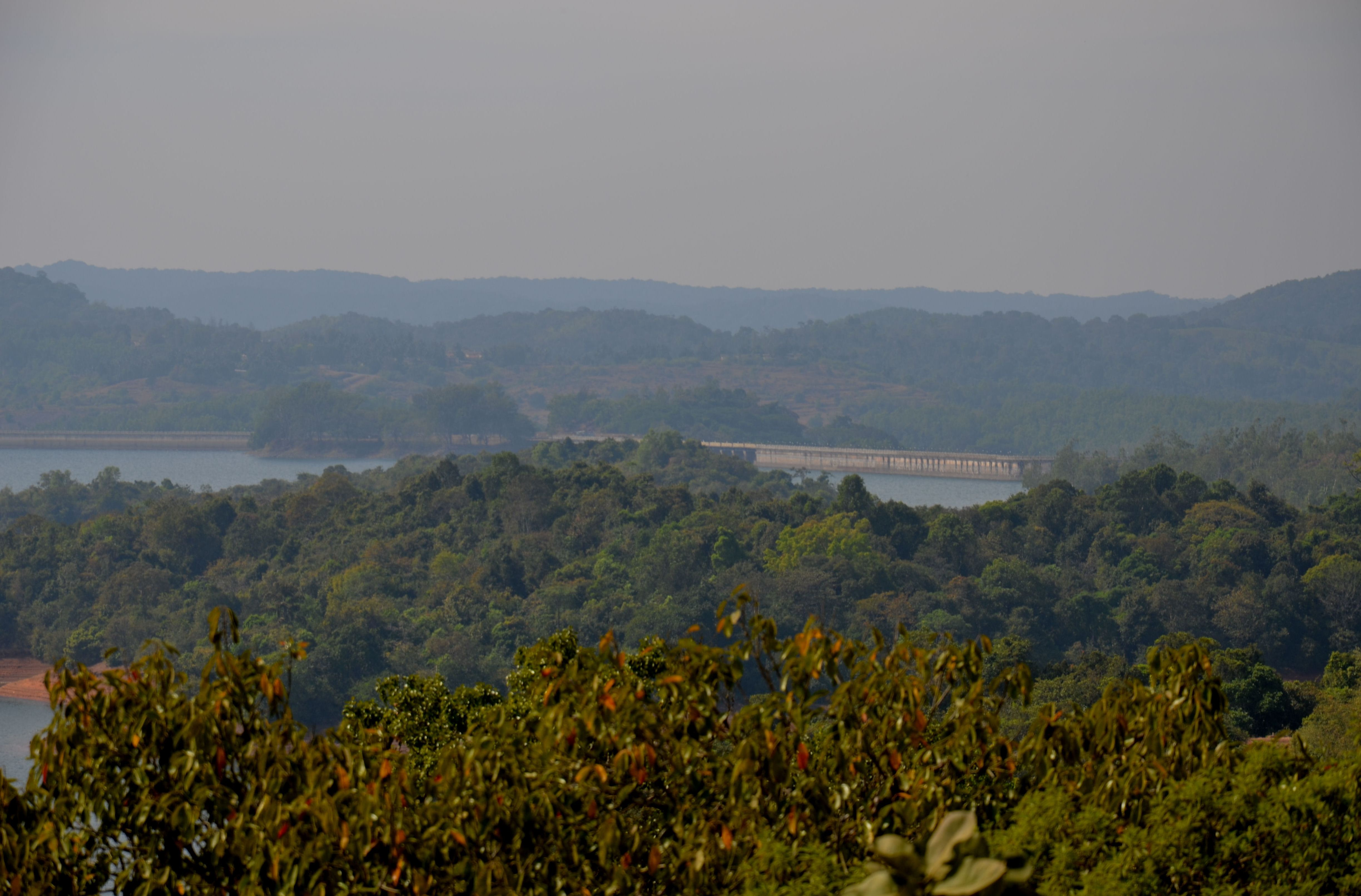
Honnemaradu

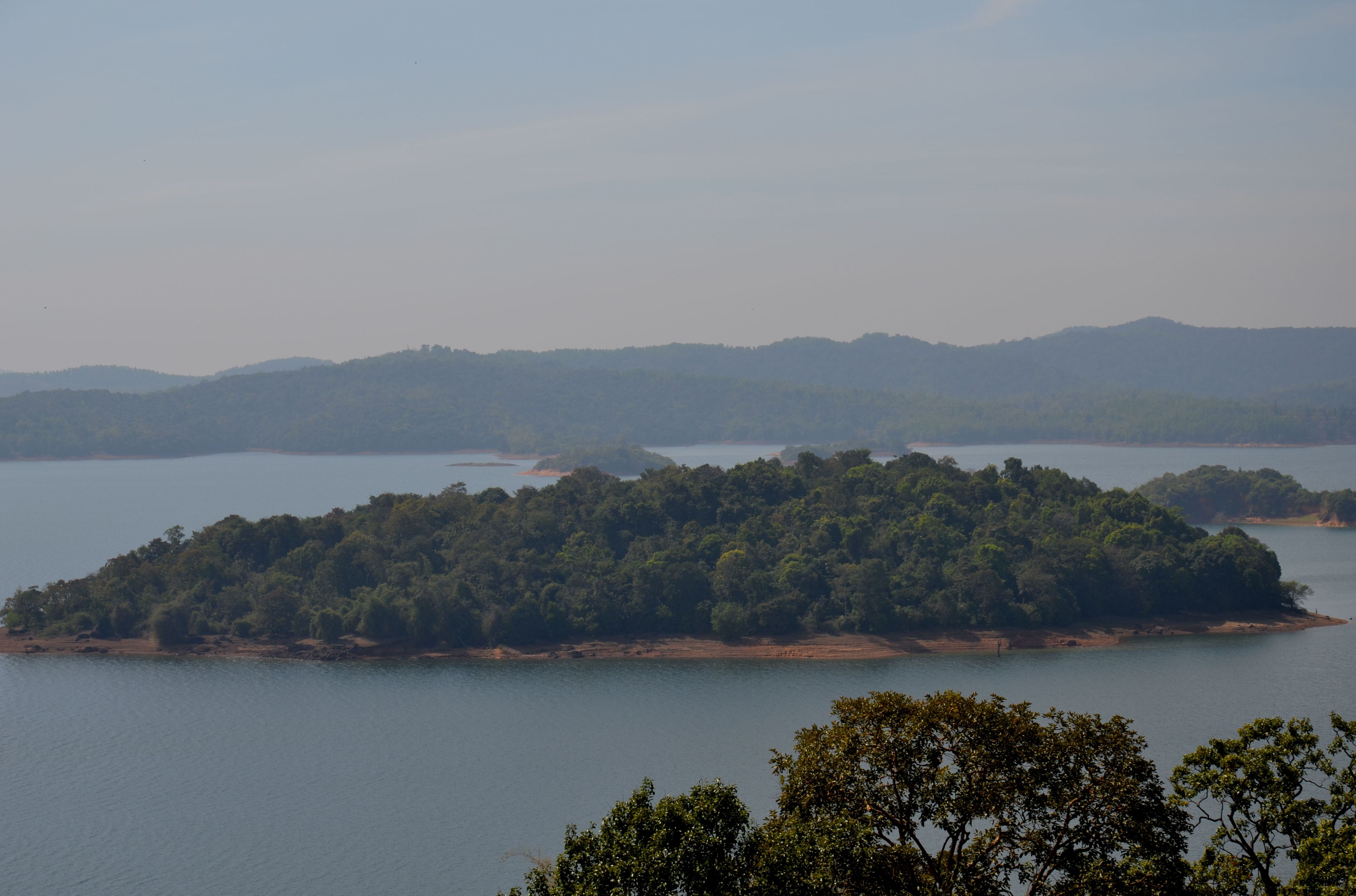
Island view at Honnemaradu

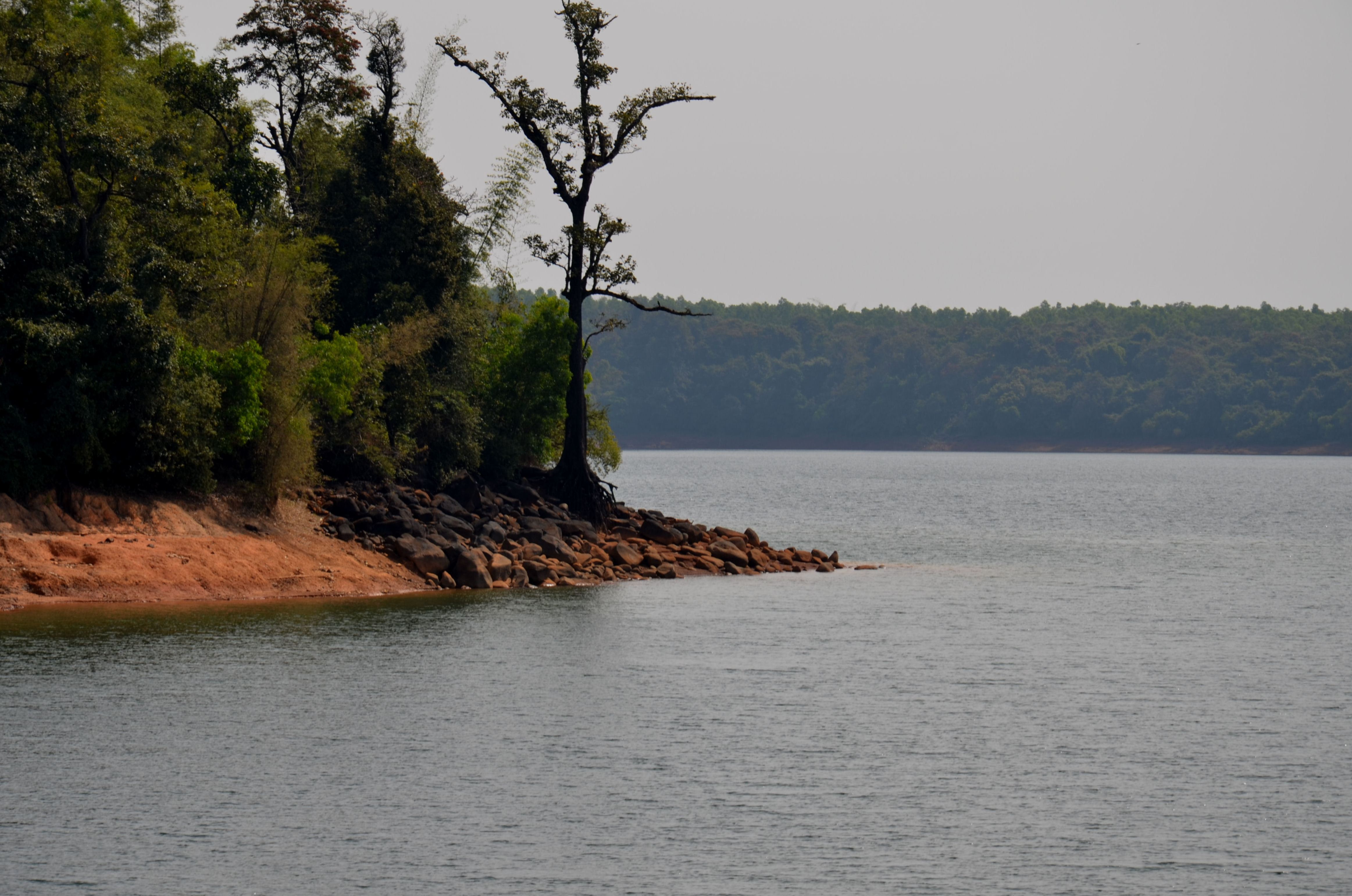
Another view of Honnemaradu

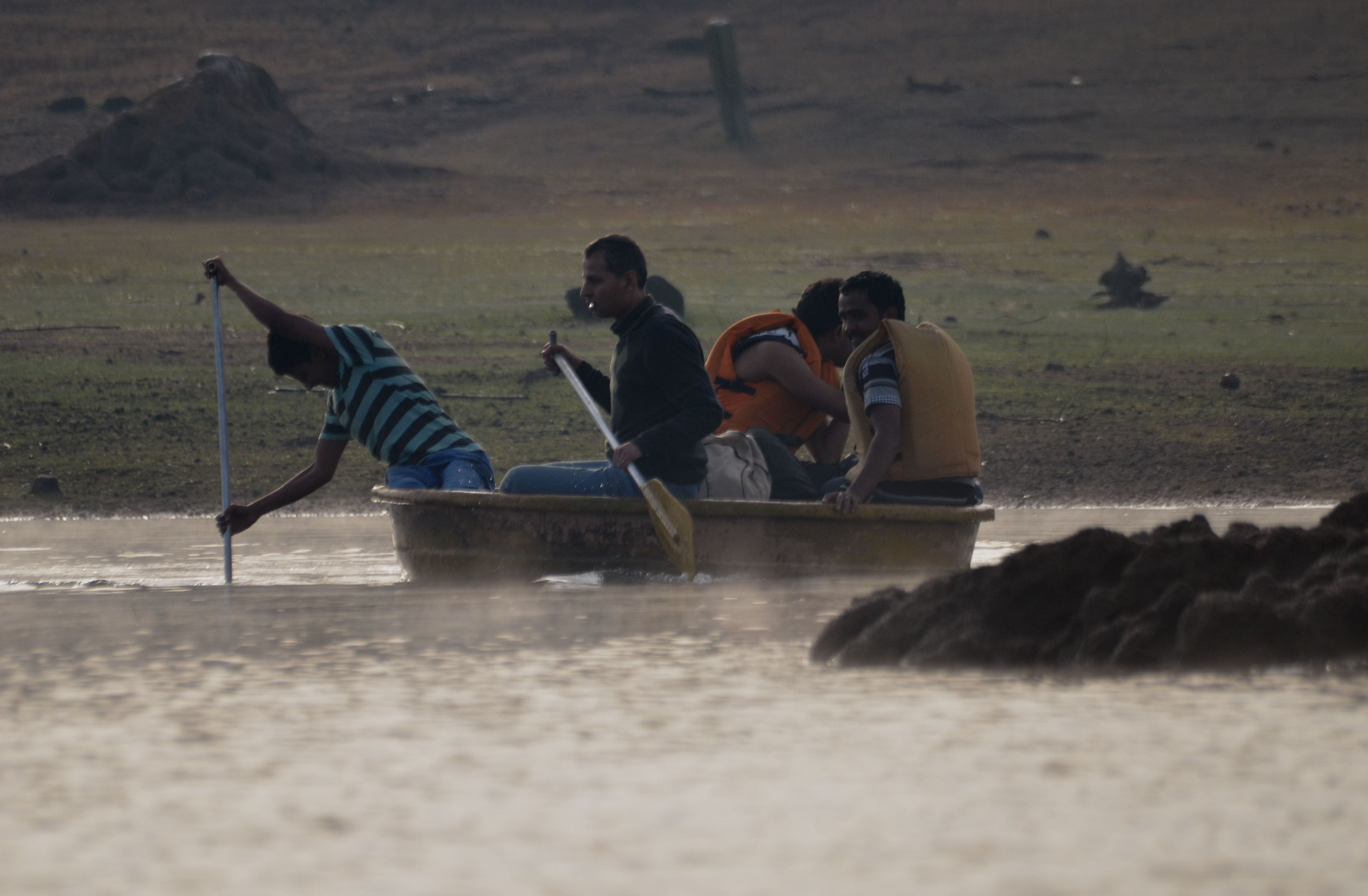
Boating at Honnemaradu

- Jog Falls is a waterfall near the village created by the Sharavathi River. The water plummets down from a great height of 230 meters (830 feet), the tenth highest in India. It is located in Sagara Taluk.
- Dabbe Falls, Sagara is located 30 km from Jog Falls.

== Transport ==
=== Road ===
- Bangalore-Shimoga-Sagar-Talaguppa-Honnemaradu
- Bellary-Hospet-Harihar-Shimoga-Sagar-Talaguppa-Honnemaradu

=== Railway station ===
- The nearest railway stations are: Shimoga - Talaguppa - Sagar
- Train Route 1: Mysore - Bangalore - Shimoga - Sagar - Talaguppa
