= Talavata =

- village
- Location in Karnataka, India Talavata (India)
- Coordinates: 14.221430°N 74.870667°E
- Country: India
- State: Karnataka
- District: Shimoga
- Taluka: Sagar

Government
  - Body: Village Panchayat

Population (2011)
  - Total: ~400

Languages
  - Official: Kannada
- Time zone: UTC+5:30 (IST)
- Postal code: 577 421
- Vehicle registration: KA 15
- Sagar: Shimoga
- Civic agency: Village Panchayat

Talavata is a village in the southern state of Karnataka, India. It is located in the border of Shimoga district and Uttara Kannada District. Its taluk is Sagara, Karnataka.

== Climate ==
As it is in malenadu, it is surrounded by evergreen forest and hills. Average ambient temperature on summer days (March to May) would be 22 °C to 28 °C. Most of the rain fall occurs from June to September. On winters (October to February), temperature falls up to 16 °C.

== Occupation ==
This place relies on the agricultural products. Primarily, Areca, Paddy (unmilled rice) and Sugar cane are grown. This place is well suited for plantations and farming. People grow Black Pepper, Coffee and other spices as well.

== Travel ==
This place is well connected by both railway and road transport system. It is adjacent to NH 206. The nearest railway station is Talaguppa. This place also hosts a few homestay for travellers. Some of the homestays in Talavata are AjjanaMane and Matthuga.

== Nearest Attractions ==
Sri Mahaganapathi Temple, Bacchagaru is the main temple and regional centre of Talavata. The nearest tourist attraction would be famous water fall, Jog Falls and river Sharavathi. Apart these, this place is near to Nipli Falls, Kallu Sankha (Stone Bridge) and View Point and Honnemaradu.

== See also ==
- Jog Falls
- Shimoga
- Districts of Karnataka
