= Adagalale =

- village
- Interactive map of Adagalale
- Coordinates: 13.9537°N 74.8136°E
- Country: India
- State: Karnataka
- District: Shimoga
- Talukas: Sagara

Government
  - Body: Village Panchayat

Languages
  - Official: Kannada
- Time zone: UTC+5:30 (IST)
- Nearest city: Sagara and Shivamogga
- Civic agency: Village Panchayat

Adagalale is a village in the southern state of Karnataka, India. It is located in the Sagara taluka of Shimoga district in Karnataka. The people of Adagalale mainly depends on agriculture, the crops are paddy and Areca nut.

== Transport ==
=== Rail ===
Sagara Jambagaru Rail Way Station is the very nearby railway stations to Adagalale. Sagara Jambagaru Rail Way Station (near to Sagar), Shiroor Rail Way Station (near to Bhatkal), Bhatkal Rail Way Station (near to Bhatkal) are the Rail way stations reachable from near by towns.

=== Road ===
Sagar, Jog Falls, and Bhatkal are the nearby by towns to Adagalale having road connectivity to Adagalale.

== Colleges near Adagalale ==
Government PU college, Tumari

Lal Bahadur Arts, Science And S.b., Solabanna Shetty Commerce College

== See also ==
- Shimoga
- Districts of Karnataka
