= Nada Kalasi =

Nada Kalasi is a tiny village in Sagara Taluk in Shimoga district, Karnataka, India. In the 13th century it was the capital of Kalise Nadu, a principality. There are two 13th-century stone temples in the village.
