= Marikamba Temple =

Marikamba Temple may refer to:

- Marikamba Temple, Sagar, a Hindu temple completed around 1596
- Marikamba Temple, Sirsi, a Hindu temple completed in 1688
