= Adaranthe =

- village
- Location in Karnataka, India Adaranthe (India)
- Coordinates: 14.231170°N 74.997580°E
- Country: India
- State: Karnataka
- District: Shimoga
- Taluka: Sagara

Government
  - Body: Village Panchayat

Languages
  - Official: Kannada
- Time zone: UTC+5:30 (IST)
- Nearest city: Shimoga
- Civic agency: Village Panchayat

Adaranthe is a village in the southern state of Karnataka, India. It is located in the Sagara taluka of Shimoga district in Karnataka.

== See also ==
- Shimoga
- Districts of Karnataka
