= Shreedhar Swami =

Marathi-Kannada saint and religious poet

- Sadguru Bhagwan Shreedhar Swami Maharaj

Personal life
- Born: 7 December 1908 Ladchincholi
- Died: 19 April 1973 (aged 64) Varadpur, Sagar
- Notable work(s): Swatm Nirupam (स्वातं निरुपम), Moksha Sandesh (मोक्ष)
- Honors: Santh

Religious life
- Religion: Hinduism
- Philosophy: Sanātana Dharma

Religious career
- Teacher: Samarth Ramdas Swami

Sri Shreedhara Swami Maharaj (7 December 1908 – 19 April 1973) was an Indian prominent Kannada-Marathi saint and religious poet in the Hindu tradition. Shreedhar Swami was a devotee of Lord Ram and a disciple of Samarth Ramdas. Recognised as the incarnation of Adi Guru Sri Dattatreya

== Early life ==
Sri Shreedhara Swami Maharaj was born in a Brahmin family to Narayan Rao and Kamalabai Deglurkar on 7 December 1908 in Lad Chincholi, Karnataka. He was born on Datta jayanti in the evening when the chariot carrying Guru Datta was passing by the house. He was born as a boon given by Adi guru Dattatreya to his parents, as they prayed to adi guru Dattatreya to be born as their child. He was a devotee of Lord Ram and a disciple of Samarth Ramdas. When Shreedhara Swami was 3 years old he lost his father and thereafter his mother and elder brother Trimbak took care of the family. Young Shreedhara was admitted to a school in Hyderabad for his primary education. Since the very early days he was spiritually inclined. One recorded incident from his early childhood is as follows: He had once fallen very ill and had lost a lot of days at school because of it. Thus he feared that he might fail in the examinations. His mother then told him to constantly chant the name of Lord Ram and that he would see him through the exams. He solemnly started doing that so much so that he finally did not do any studies at all and all the time chanted the name of Ram. On the day of examination he went without reading anything and to the surprise of everybody he answered every question so nicely that he did secure first rank. Shreedhar Swami's elder brother died when he (Shreedhar) was just ten. His mother, unable to cope with the shock and prolonged illness, soon followed him. After her death Shreedhar Swami went to Gulbarga to live with his aunt and continued his education there. After spending a few years in Gulbarga, he headed for Pune where he lived in an orphanage for sometime. Here his urge for spiritual enlightenment grew and on the suggestion of one Mr. Palnitkar, he embarked on a journey to Sajjangad with the intent of seeking spiritual knowledge at the place where Shri Samarth Ramdas had resided nearly three hundred years ago.

== Sajjangad and Spiritual Awakening ==
During the course of time, he got well-acquainted with one of his teachers at school, Shri palnitkar Guruji. Discovering Sridhar's intense inclination towards spiritualism, he advised him to solicit the blessings of Samartha Ramdas Swamiji. Sajjangad was the abode of Swami Samarth Ramdas for the last six years of his life. Legend has it that a stone structure (his Samadhi) surged out of its own at the cremation place of Shri Samartha on the very next day of his nirvana. His yearning for a spiritual awakening at this point can be gauged by the fact that he started to dispose all his money to the poor and the remaining he just threw. He liked a particular sweet dish, so he bought it, kept it in front of Lord Ram's idol and then mixed cow dung in it and ate it. Now he could not even think about the dish he once liked so much. On the day of departure to Sajjangad, Which also coincided with Vijayadashmi, he suddenly felt that he was going there to find out the creator of the universe who had control over the living, nonliving things and also time and space. After one and a half years of having arrived at Sajjangad, Samarth Ramdas himself blessed Shreedhar Swami. Later, he directed him to go south to Karnataka and spread the real message of Sanatan Vedic Dharma.

== Touring India for religious Revival ==
For the next thirteen years, Shreedhar Swami toured most of south India on foot. He used to halt at temples and Mathas where he would deliver discourses on Sanatan Vedic Dharma for religious upheaval. During his travels he made acquaintances with many other well known Hindu religious leaders and saints. The most significant of these was with Sivananda Swami of Shigehalli. He also visited the Vivekananda Rock Memorial and performed meditation there. In 1942, Shreedhar Swami took Sannyasa at Shigehalli and was accorded the title, 'Shreemat Paramhans Parivrajakacharya Bhagwan Shreedhar Swami'. After this till 1967, he extensively toured all over India and through his speeches, writings and spiritual initiatives, spread the core messages of the Vedas among common people. He, returned south to Varadapura in 1967 where he set up an ashram. He practised, held Hindu exorcism in various holy places, temples including Kolgibis (Kumta road), to drive ghosts, spirits out of any hosts body they have taken over, using his mantradanada staff.

== Final Days ==
On the first day of the second half of the first month of the Hindu calendar, Swamiji's health deteriorated. The disciples again pleaded for bringing a doctor, but Swamiji again refused and told them that Samarth Ramdas had told that the bodily pains should be considered as pleasures. He enquired what day was the next one and when told about that he knew that it was a day for very auspicious things, but didn't tell it to anyone. Then as usual he took bath thrice, had a little milk and rested for a while in the night and spent the rest of the time in sahaj Samadhi avastha. Swamiji got up the next morning at 5 am. After the morning chores he sat in meditation for a while. He came out of the meditation room at 8 am. The disciples requested him to have some milk, to which he agreed and again sat in meditation. Swamiji in sitting position and in meditation twice said 'Om, Om' and then from the upper side of his body through the head he made his soul leave his body to be eternally unified with the Parbramha. Despite this his posture didn't change nor did his facial expressions. In fact the aura around his face became brighter for a while. This was at 9 am. on 19 April 1973. After a while Swamiji had attained the Ultimate Samadhi. On hearing this all hell broke loose over the ashram. The news spread like a wild fire as it was announced over the All India Radio and Swamiji's disciples started coming to Varadpur. His body was placed on a specially made bed of flowers.

== Writings—Spreading The Message ==
Shreedhar Swami was a gifted composer and fluent in Marathi, Sanskrit, Kannada, Hindi and English. All through his extensive travelling, he managed to spare some time for religious writing. His aim was to simplify the complex nuances of vedic teaching into a form that would be easily digestible to the common man.

Unclutter the day and create windows of silence for the mind. Windows which catch the light of peace and clarity. Windows which let oxygen into the mind.

He wrote prolifically and wrote over twenty books in Marathi, Kannada and English.

== Landmarks ==
Here's a brief overview of the key milestones in his life:

- 7 December 1908: Birth at Lad Chincholi, Gulbarga, Karnataka
- 1912-1923: Education at Hyderabad
- 1923-1927: Spent time at Pune and Sajjangad
- 1927: Received blessings from Samarth Ramadas
- 1942: Became a Sanyasi at Shigehalli and began touring South India and later North India, giving spiritual discourses and sparking a religious upheaval
- 1958-1973: Undertook sadhana and settled at Varadapura, Sagar, Karnataka, established ashram
- 19 April 1973: Passed away at Varadapur, Sagar, fulfilling his own wish
