= Holebaagilu, Sagara =

Holebaagilu
- Tourist place
- Holebaagilu, Sagara

- Location in Karnataka, India
- Coordinates: 14.1667°N 75.1233°E
- Country: India
- State: Karnataka
- Region: Malenadu
- District: Shimoga
- Subdivision: Sagara

Languages
  - Official: Kannada
- Time zone: UTC+5:30 (IST)
- PIN: 577401
- Telephone code: 08183
- Vehicle registration: KA-15(Sagar sub division)

Holebaagilu is situated on the banks of the Sharavati River about 30 km (19 mi) from Sagar, Karnataka. Drivers have to take a diversion from B. H. Road towards Ikkeri Road to get there. The Sharavati backwaters of Linganamakki dam has submerged acres of land. It is in Kolur Grama Panchayat limits. One has to take a flatboat to get across the backwaters to reach the other side where Sigandooru is.
