= Handigodu syndrome =

- Specialty: Orthopedic

Handigodu syndrome is a rare and painful osteoarthritic disorder endemic to the Malnad region in the state of Karnataka, India. Also known as Handigodu joint disease, it derives its name from the village of Handigodu in the Sagara taluk of the Shimoga district of Karnataka where it was first noticed. This disease currently has no cure. Scientifically it is termed Endemic Familial Arthritis of Malnad. Since the day it was discovered, it has claimed over 1000 lives and has left many people crippled. Apart from Sagara taluk, the disease has also been reported from the Koppa, Narasimharajapura and Sringeri taluks of Chikkamagaluru district.

== Symptoms and signs ==
Symptoms of the disease are an acute pain and swelling in the hips and knee joints. Some of the other characteristics of this disease are dwarfism from birth, deformation of the limbs after age seven and death as early as between 25 and 30 years or even younger. Depending on the mobility of the affected patients, the disease has been identified with three severities: in mild to moderate cases, the patient is able to walk with difficulty, in severe cases mobility is very restricted, whereas in acute cases the limbs are bent and badly crippled making the patients crawl.

== Research ==
A team from the National Institute of Nutrition, Hyderabad conducted research in the affected regions and found out that the disease was confined to a dalit colony. They also found out that the disease was affecting people of all age groups and it was non-contagious and non-infectious. This research was further followed by research conducted over four years (1984–88) by the Indian Council of Medical Research (ICMR). Study groups involving experts from different medical fields were formed and these groups visited the affected places to conduct experiments. They were also helped by the Health Department of Karnataka who also provided a team to assist them. Despite undertaking extensive research, the team could not come into any conclusion on the cause of the disease. The team wound up in 1988 and this was the first phase of their research. The second phase of the research by ICMR was started in the year 2001 under the leadership of S. S. Agarwal of the Sanjay Gandhi Post-graduate centre in Lucknow. Some of the activities in the second phase were to x-ray the patients and also study their family history to see if the disease was related to genetics. The study reported that Handigodu syndrome is a syndrome of familial spondyloepi(meta)physeal dysplasia. It is inherited as an autosomal dominant trait. All the presentations of the varied manifestation of the disease could be explained as being caused by defective development of bones as a result of monogenic disorder.

== History ==
Handigodu syndrome was first noticed by H M Chandrashekhar in the village of Handigodu during the years 1974–75. Four patients who complained of severe joint and hip pain were admitted to the General Hospital at Sagar. The doctors who could not diagnose the problem attributed the pain to some neurological disorder. Seeking advice on this disease, a team of experts led by K. S. Mani, a neurologist from NIMHANS, Bangalore visited the region. After examining the patients, they ruled out any neurological disorder and implied that the pain was due to a bone and joint disorder.

== Society and culture ==
A subsistence allowance is provided to the patients by the Government of Karnataka from the fund reserved for the physically challenged. Assistance has also been provided to construct houses for them. A special treatment unit has been set up in the Government Hospital at Sagar with an ambulance provided to shift the affected patients to the hospital.
