= Varada =

Coordinates: 14°55′47″N 75°40′56″E

Varada River
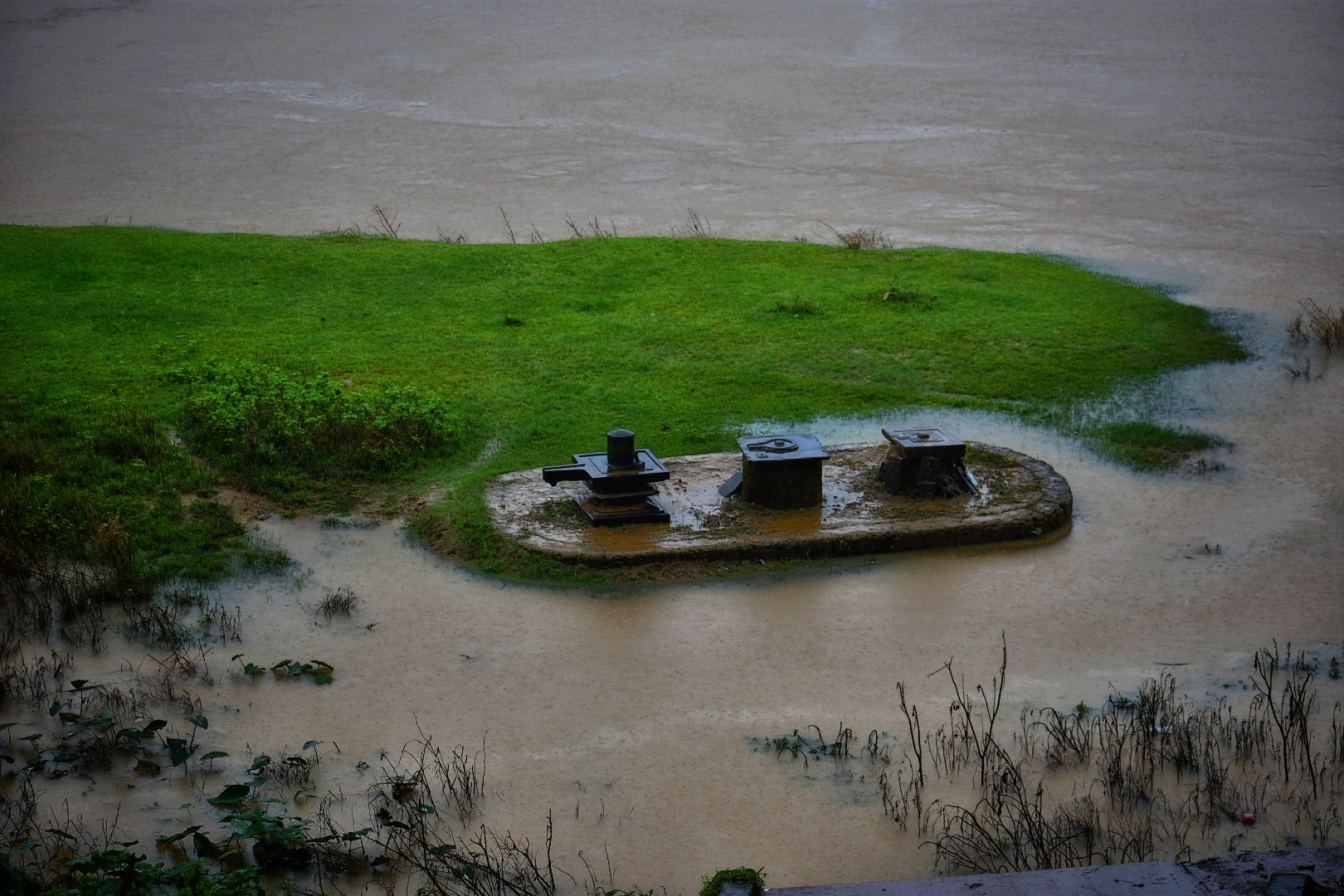
- Varada river at Banavasi

Location
- Country: India
- State: Karnataka
- Region: Malenadu
- Districts: Uttara Kannada; Shivamogga; Haveri
- Cities: Banavasi; Sagara

Physical characteristics
- Source: VaradaMoola
- Mouth: Tungabhadra River
  - location: Galaganatha

The Varada River (Verada River) is a river in central Karnataka, India. It originates in Varadamoola . It is a tributary of the Tungabhadra River.

== Geography ==
The Varada river originates near Varadamoola in Sagara of Karnataka. It flows through the Western Ghats and enters the central districts of Karnataka, (Haveri and Bellary). The river joins the Tungabhadra River at Galaganath.

It is important to the wellbeing of the Kannada people along its course. Dams have been constructed along the river's course, providing water for irrigation and domestic purposes during summer. There are, however, no major irrigation projects on this river, although the government is considering one.

== Cultural significance ==
The river has divine association for Indians.

Shringarishi was once in deep penance, praying for forgiveness, from Lord vishnu, for committing the Bramhahatyadosha. Sriman Narayana appeared before him and poured gangajal on the rishi's head. This gangajal formed the Varada river.
