= Sigandur =

Sigandooru
- Location in Karnataka

Religion
- Affiliation: Hinduism
- District: Shimoga
- Deity: Sigandooru Chowdeshwari (Sigandooreshwari)

Location
- Location: Sagara, Karnataka
- State: Karnataka
- Country: India
- Coordinates: 14°4′34″N 74°52′20″E

Architecture
- Temple: 1

Website
- sigandurchowdeshwari.com

Sigandur or Sigandooru is a village near Tumari, located in the Indian state of Karnataka. The village is known for the Sigandur Chowdeshwari Temple, a Hindu pilgrimage site that attracts hundreds daily.

== Geography ==
The village is surrounded on three sides by the backwaters of Linganamakki dam, formed by the Sharavathi River.

Sigandur is about 40 km from its taluk headquarters, Sagara town and 8 km from tumari. Sigandur was cut off from Sagar once the reservoir on Sharavathi River was constructed. Two barges carry vehicles, tourists, pilgrims and locals.

Sigandur is surrounded by water on three sides and connected by road on one side, which can be reached via Kollur and Nagodi. Barge is the major means of transport.

== Sigandur Chowdeshwari Temple ==
Shree Chowdeshwari Temple is named Sigandur. Shree Devi kshethra was built in the 18th century. Sigandur kshethra is near Tumari, 42 km from Sagar town. Mother Choudeshwari is called “Sigandureshwari”.

Shri choudamma Devi has strength to proceed the fear of thieves. The devotees who carry on benedicts will live happily without any fear of thieves. If any theft takes place in the home of these devotees, Devi punishes them.

No other kshethra protects peo and their belongings from thieves. This is managed by the board “Shri Deviya Rakshane Ide”. If a thief steals from the place where the board is kept the thief will face several problems. Varadali Bhagavan Shri Sridharaswamy once visited Sigandur. His Highness Shri Sridharaswamy prayed to the goddess to bless devotees with her sowmyaswaroopa. On the right side of the temple “Bhoothada Katte” is written. Lord Veerabhadra guards the Kshethra. On the left side Shri Shaneshwara and Shri Raktheshwari Temple are found.

== Ashada pooja ==
During Ashada month (June - July), special pooja and worship are held. Thousands of people travel to join this pooja, resulting in frequent stampedes and injuries to devotees due to lack of crowd management.
