= Marikamba Temple, Sagara =

- Marigudi
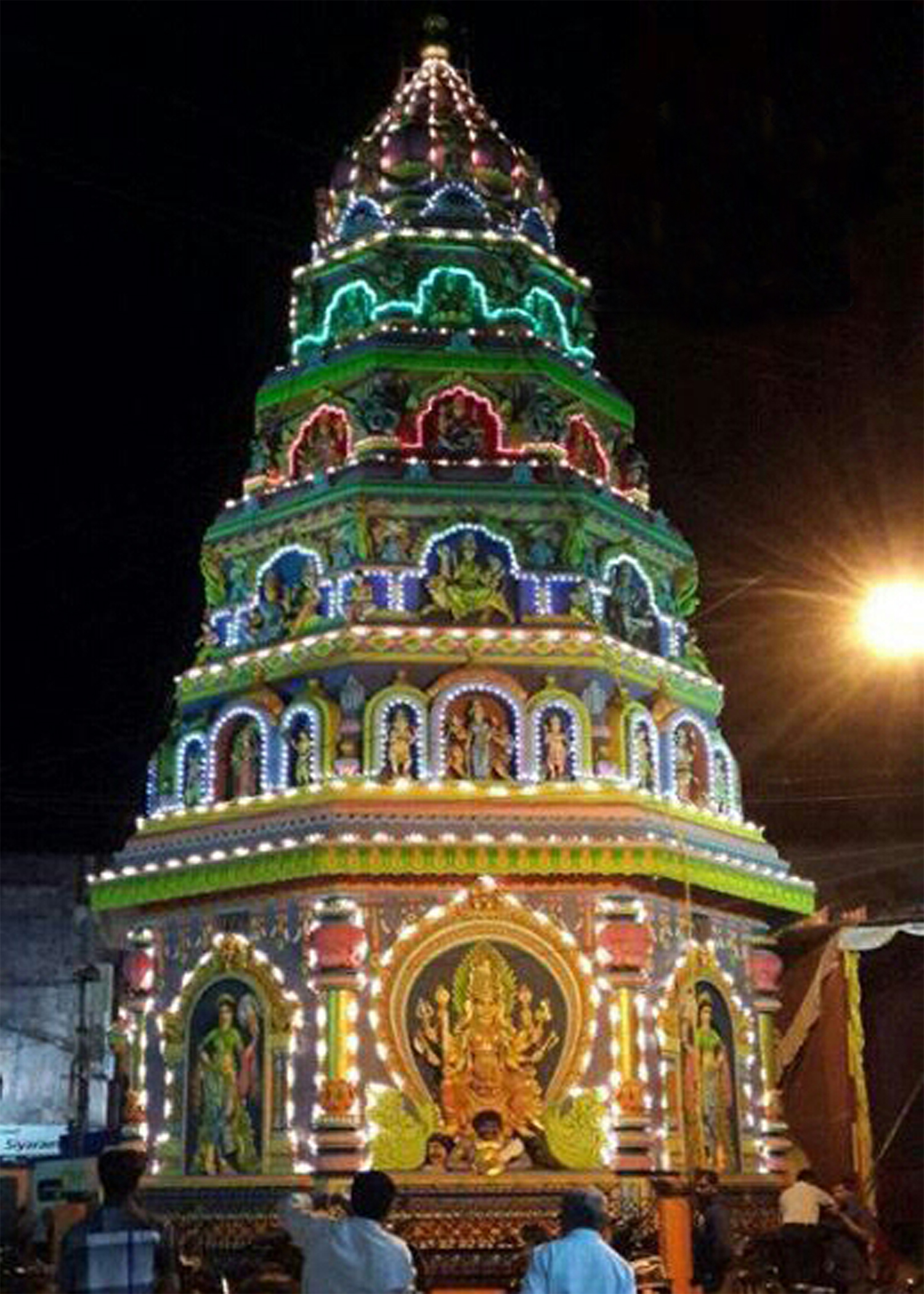

- Location in Karnataka

Religion
- Affiliation: Hinduism
- Deity: Marikamba Devi
- Festivals: Navaratri and Marikamba Fair

Location
- Location: Sagara
- State: Karnataka
- Country: India
- Interactive map of Marikamba Temple, Sagara
- Coordinates: 14°10′00″N 75°02′00″E

The Marikamba Temple is located in Sagara in the Shimoga district in the Indian state of Karnataka. It features the image of the goddess Marikamba Devi. The temple was built in the center of the city during the reign of Venkatappa Nayaka who ruled over Keladi and Ikkeri kingdom during the 16th century. Marikamba was the family deity of the Nayakas of Keladi.

== History ==
Adi Shankaracharya, the philosopher saint of Hindu religion, during one of his tours around South India visited Sagar. During his stay in the town goddess Marikamba appeared in his dream and told him to establish a temple for her at this place. He then consecrated the foot prints of the goddess at the outer limits of the city. During this period (1596) Venkatappa Nayaka, ruler of the Keladi and Ikkeri kingdom, adopted this deity as his family goddess seeking blessings to attain victory in the battle. After he won the battle, he shifted the footprints of the goddess from the outskirts to a central location in the city and built a temple to house the footprints.

During the early 1950s, there was a move to shift the temple from the center of the city to the outer limits. At the time, the city was affected by the plague epidemic, the cause for which was attributed to the proposal of moving the temple.

== Fair ==
Every three years, in the month of February or March, a 9-day fair is held at the venue of the temple. Known as the Marikamba Jathra (‘Jathra’ means "fair"), it is one of the major festivals of Karnataka. It has socio–religious importance and is attended by a large number of devotees from all regions of Karnataka. On this occasion, a 16 feet (4.9 m) high chariot, colourfully decorated and carrying the image of the idol, is taken out on a procession.

== Gallery ==
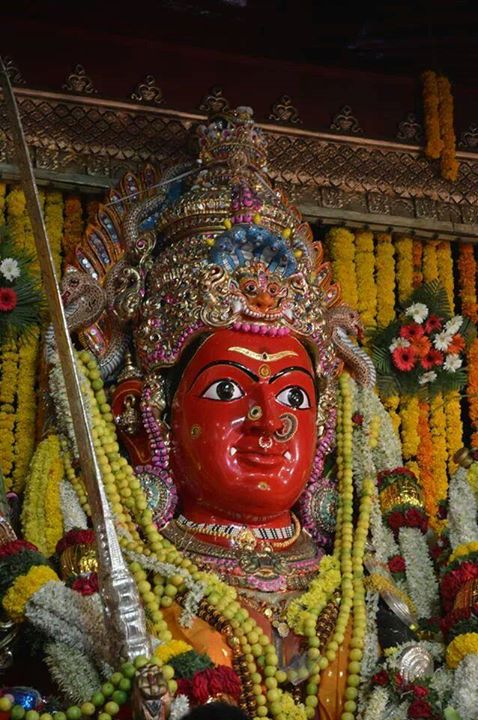
Sagara Marikamba Devi

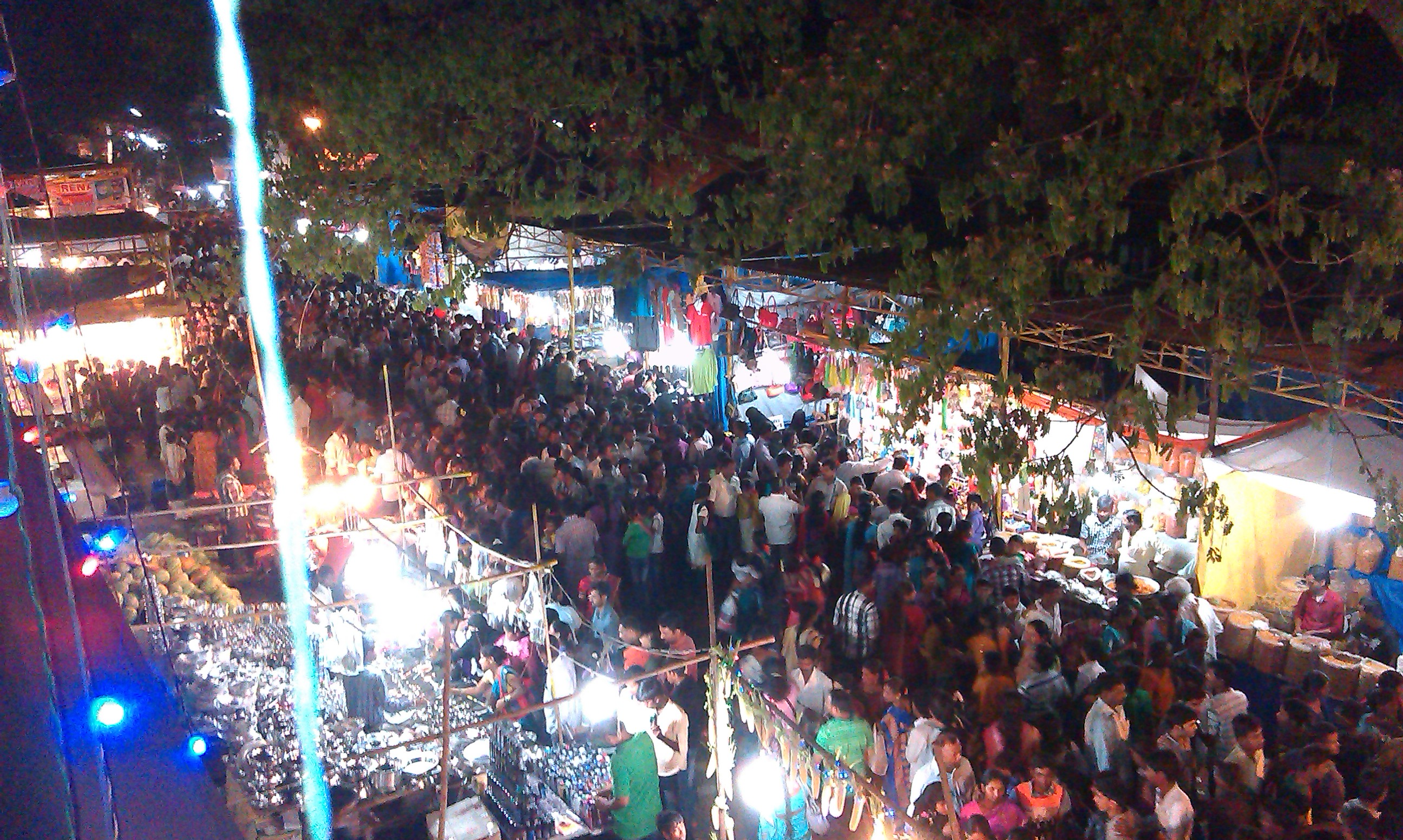
Sagara Jatre Time

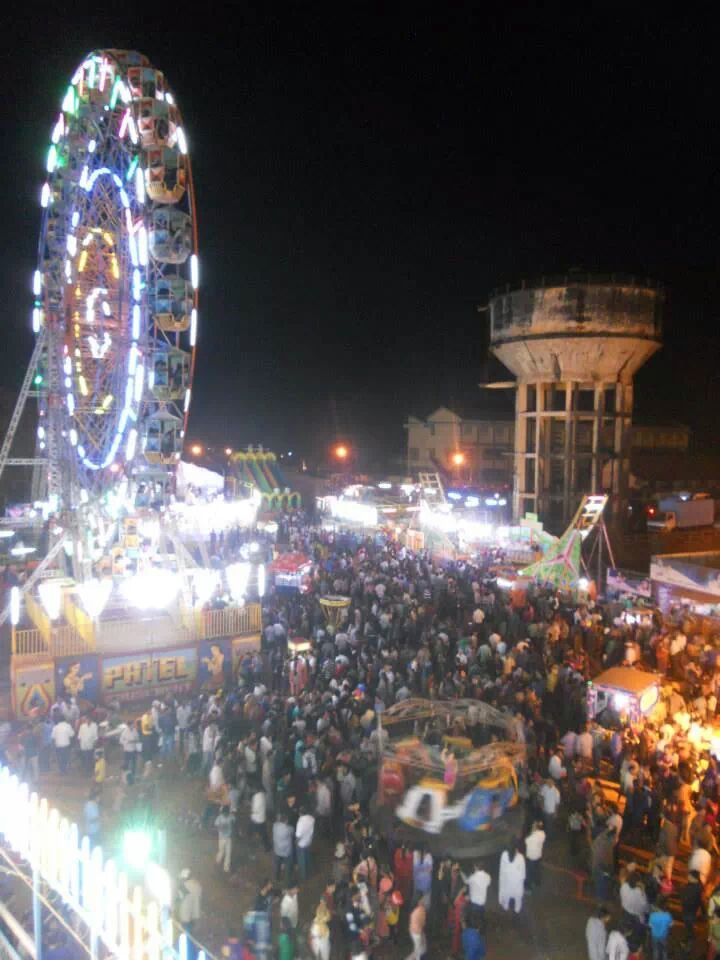
Sagara Marikamba Jatre

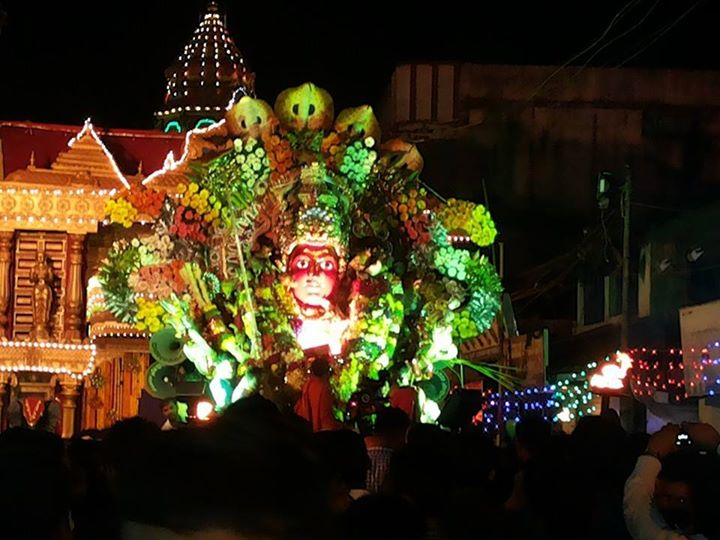
Devi Meravanige (Procession)

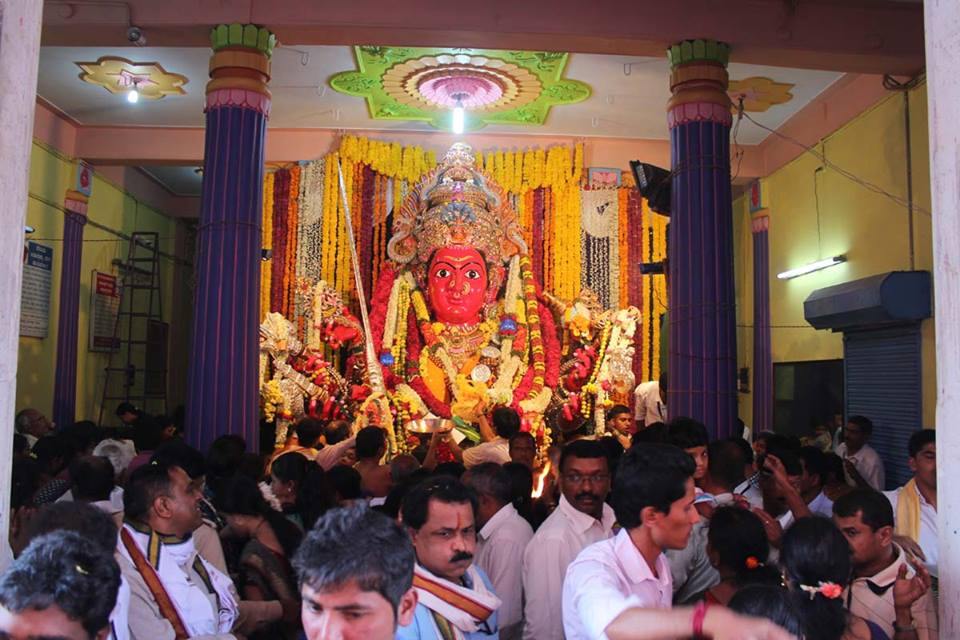
Marikamba Devi Sagara

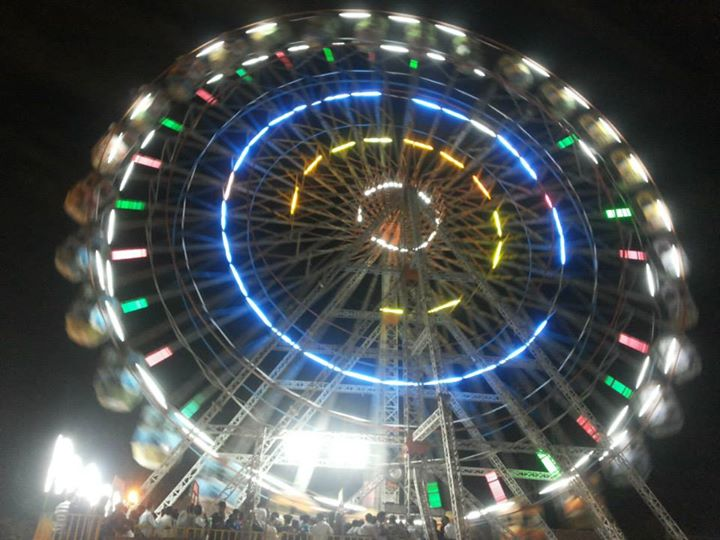
Giant Wheel

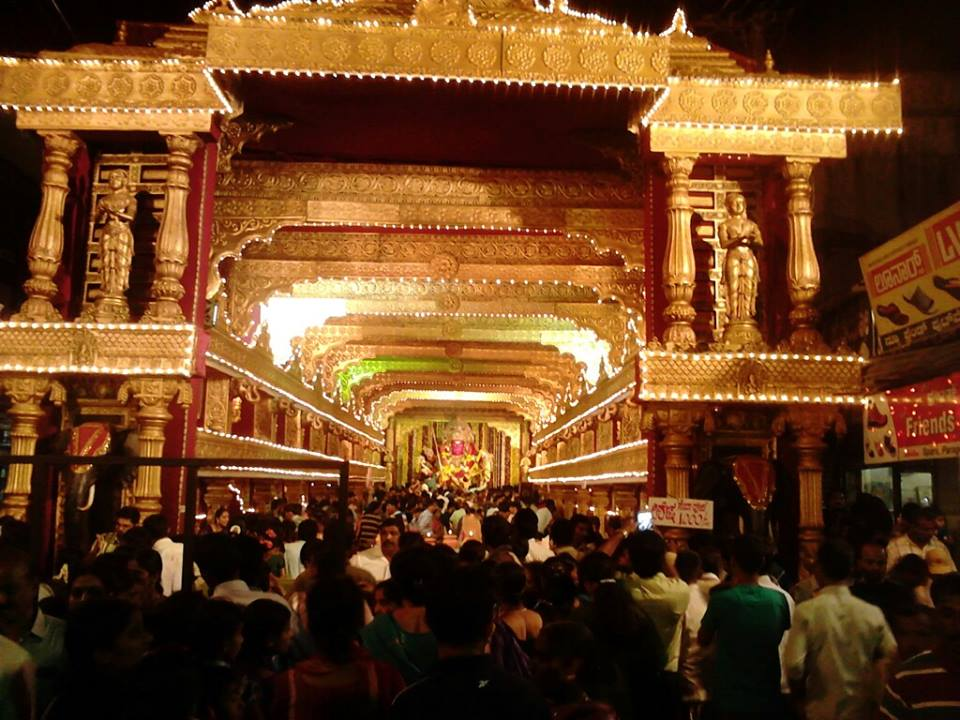
Jatre Mantapa

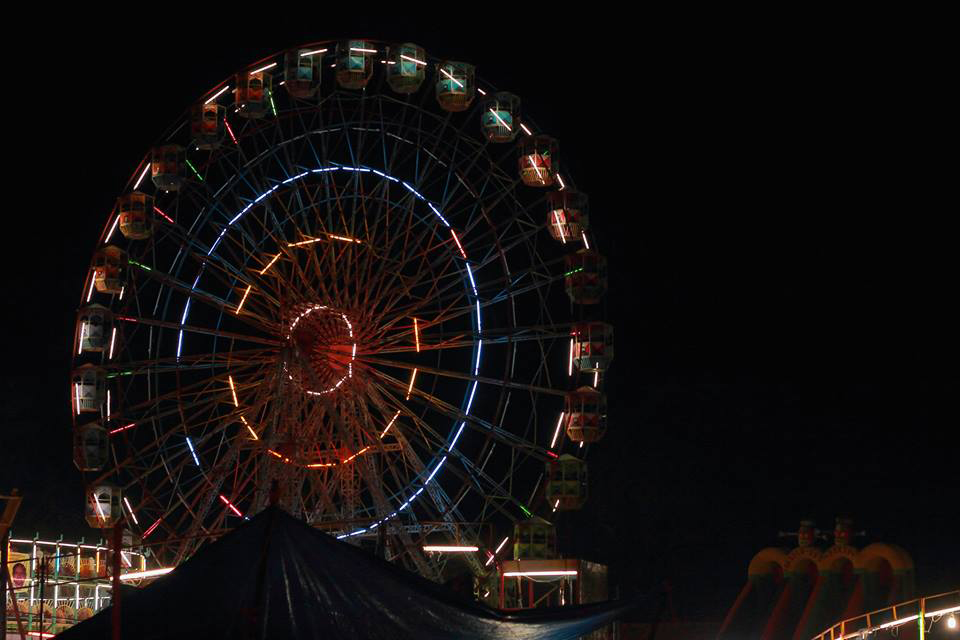
Sagara Jatre

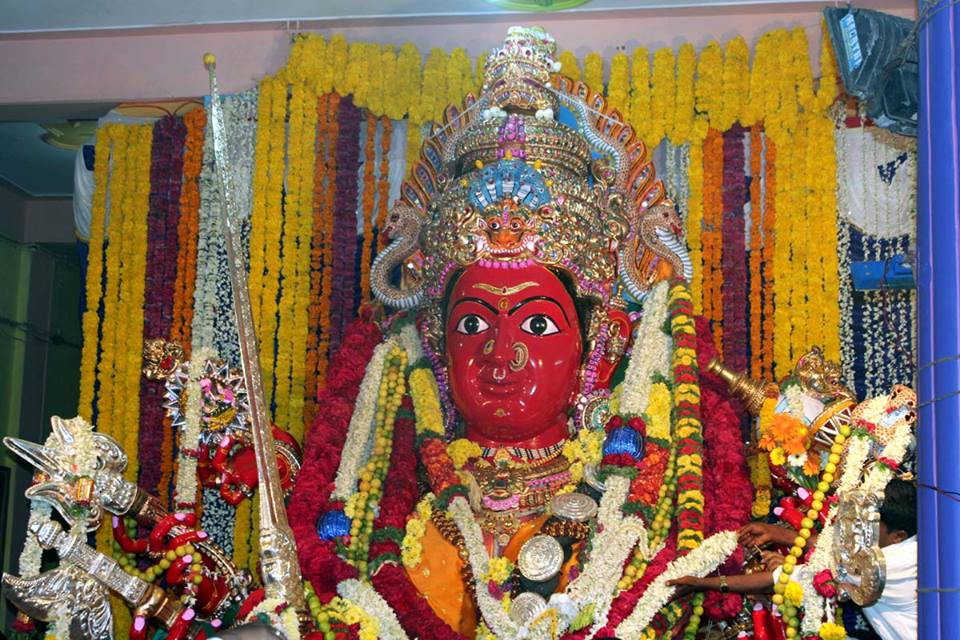
Marikamba Sagara

== See also ==
- Marikamba Temple, Sirsi
- Chamundeshwari Temple, Mysore
- Mookambika Temple, Kollur
- Annapurneshwari Temple, Cherukunnu
- Yellamma Temple, Saundatti
