= Ikkeri =

- town
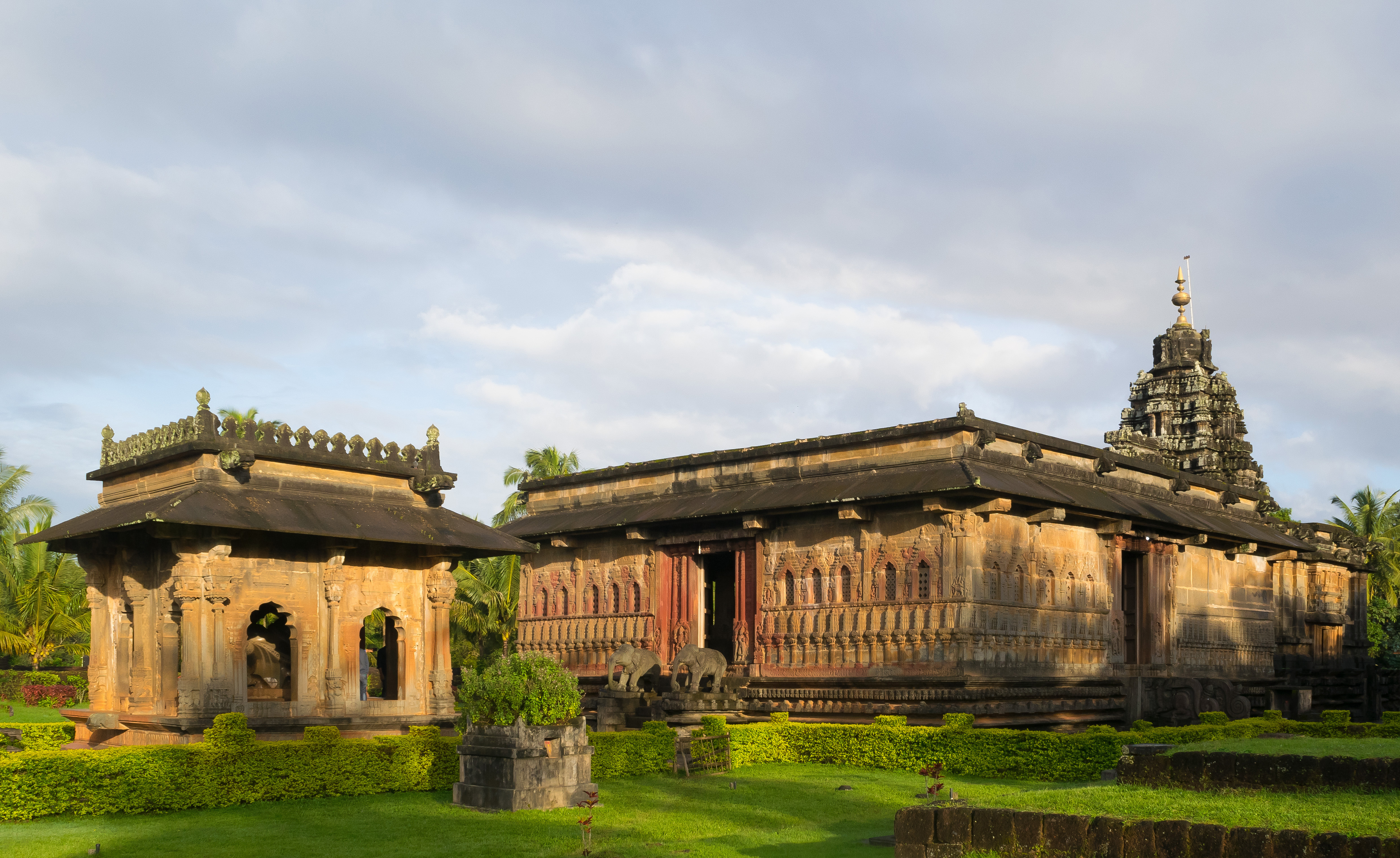
- Aghoreshwara Temple, in South Indian architecture, Keladi Nayakar period

- Location in Karnataka, India
- Coordinates: 14.1350°N 75.0226°E
- Country: India
- State: Karnataka
- District: Sagara Shimoga

Government
  - Type: Panchayat raj
  - Body: Gram panchayat

Languages
  - Official: Kannada
- Time zone: UTC+5:30 (IST)
- Telephone code: 08183
- ISO 3166 code: IN-KA
- Vehicle registration: KA-15(Sagara)
- Website: karnataka.gov.in

Ikkeri (Kannada: [ikːeːri]) is a hamlet situated in Sagara taluk (township) about 6 km to the south of the town centre in Sagara. It is known for the Aghoreshvara Temple, dedicated to an avatar of Shiva. The word Ikkeri in Kannada means "two streets".

== Nayakas of Ikkeri ==
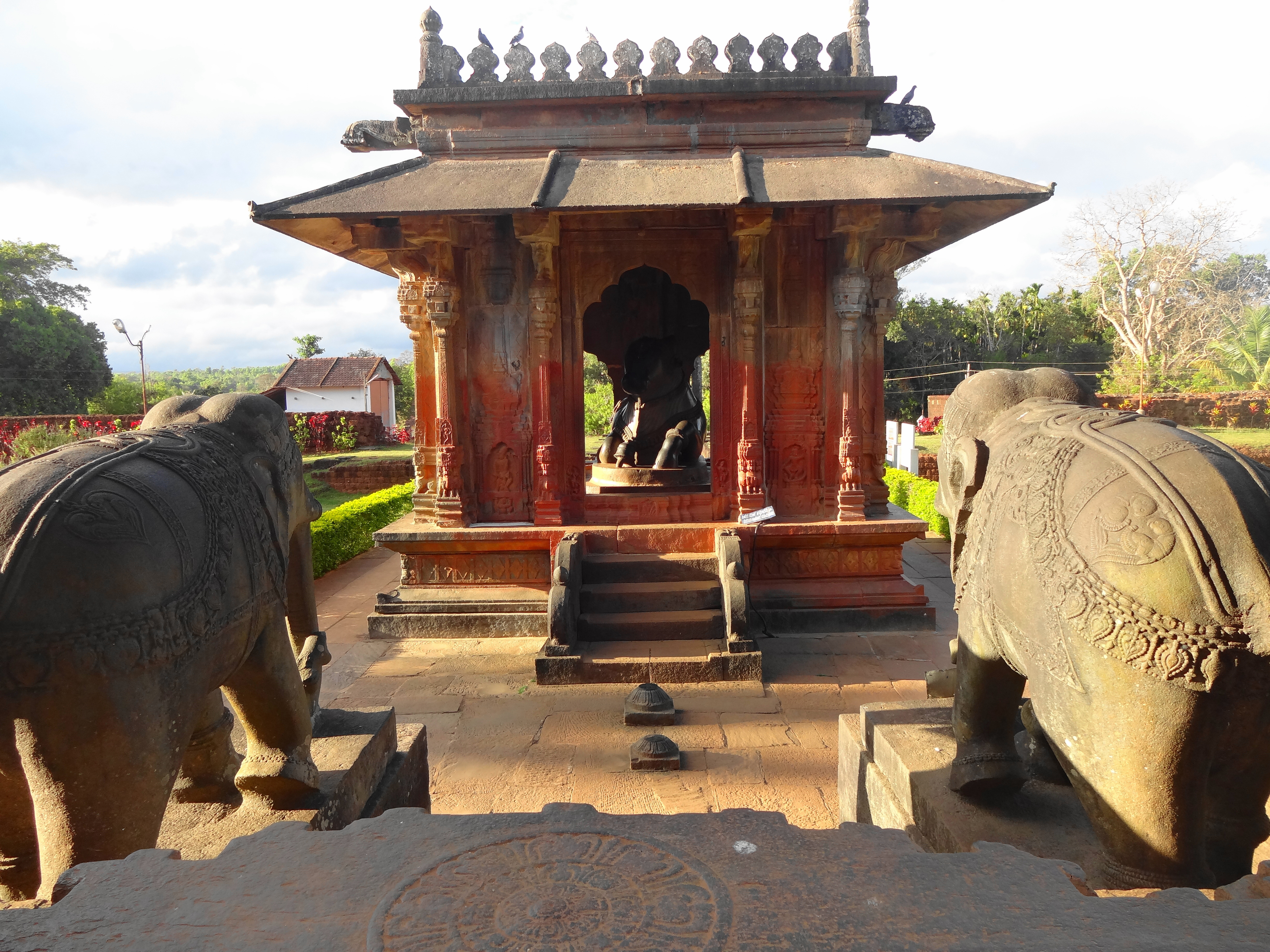
Nandi mantap

From about 1560 to 1640 AD, it was the capital of the kingdom of the Nayakas of Keladi, afterwards moved to Bednur Nagara. Ikkeri however continued to be the nominal capital, the Raajas were called by its name, and the coins were called Ikkeri Pagodas and Fanams, although, if fact, the mint was removed. Its walls were of great extent, forming three concentric enclosures. In the citadel was the palace, of mud and timber, adorned with carving and false gilding. The only vestige of its former greatness is the temple of Aghoreshvara a large and well proportioned stone-building. On the floor in front of the shrine are the effigies of three of the Keladi chiefs, doing obeisance, with the name inscribed above each. One of them, Huchcha (Mad) Somasekhara, is represented as manacled and fettered. The distance between the central pillars was adopted as the standard measure for garden land. A rod of this length, equal to 18 feet 6 inches, was the space called daya allowed for one tree, and the shist was fixed on 1,000 such daya at various rates constructed in a mixed style with a unique conception.

== Aghoresvara temple ==
The Aghoresvara temple above mentioned is a large structure, built of granite, in a uniquely mixed style that incorporates elements from Vijayanagara architecture, the Karnataka Dravida style of the Later Chalukya dynasty and Hoysala Empire.

There are three shrines, the biggest dedicated to Aghoresvara (Shiva), a Parvati shrine to its left and a Nandi in the front.

The temple faces north and has lofty roof and ornamental doorways on the west, north and east, the north doorway being the best with two elephants at the sides. The Garbhagriha, which is built of huge stones, contains a gigantic pedestal occupying nearly three-fourths of the whole space and sculptured all round with 32 seated female figures called Shakta pitha. In the Sukhanasi is a small translucent Nandi (bull) carved out of white spar. The temple has no navaranga doorway there are two niches, those to the right containing the figures of Ganesha and Subramanya and those to the left figures of Mahishasuramardini and Bhairava.

There are intricate carvings on the stone walls of the temple. There are carvings & sculptures such as Temple Relief (sculpture consisting of shapes carved on a surface so as to stand out from the surrounding background), Figurine, Old Kannada Manuscript, Sculpted Elephant etc.

At present it is maintained by Archaeological Survey of India.

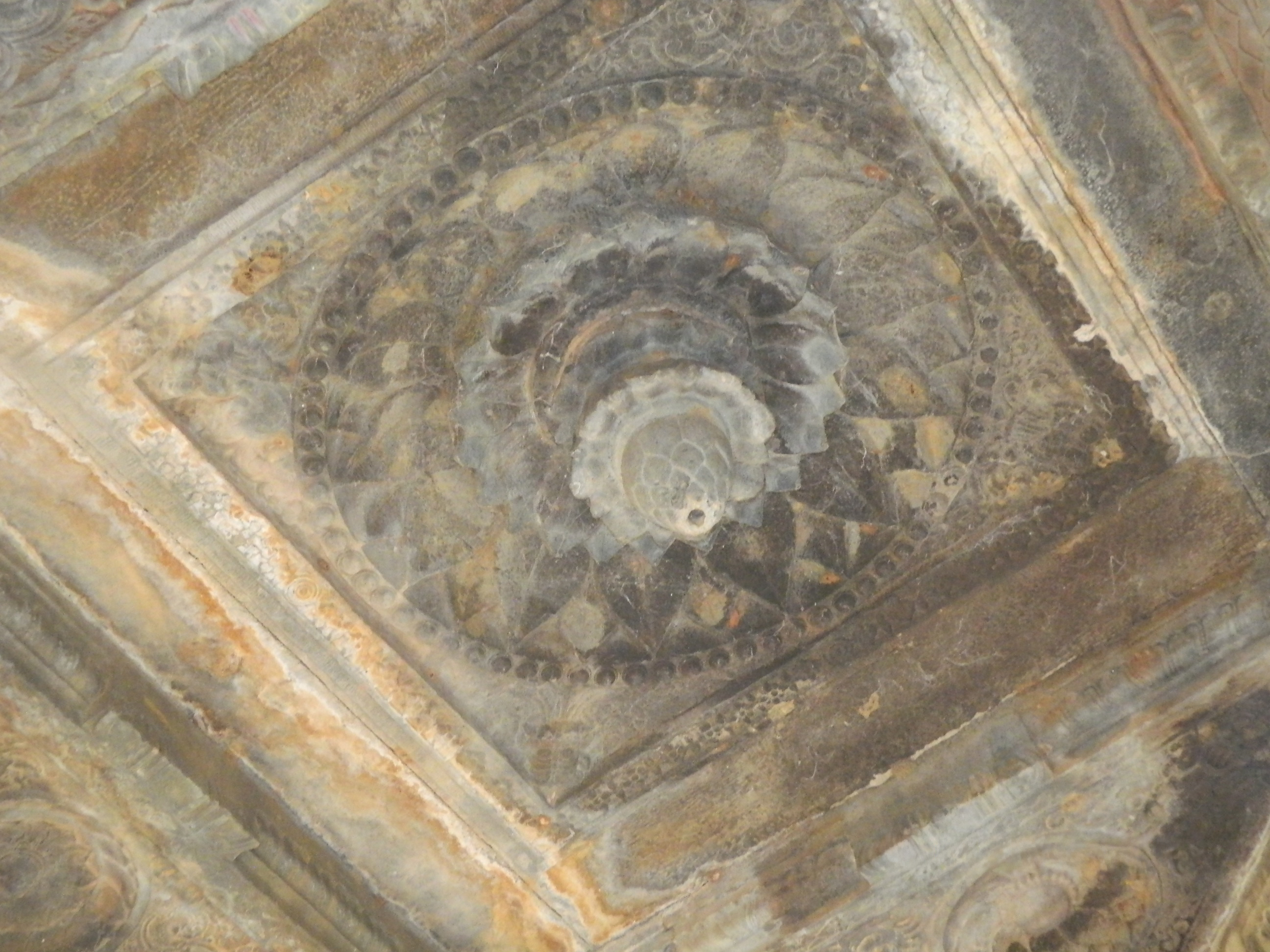
interior of aghoreshvara temple, ikkeri

== Gallery ==
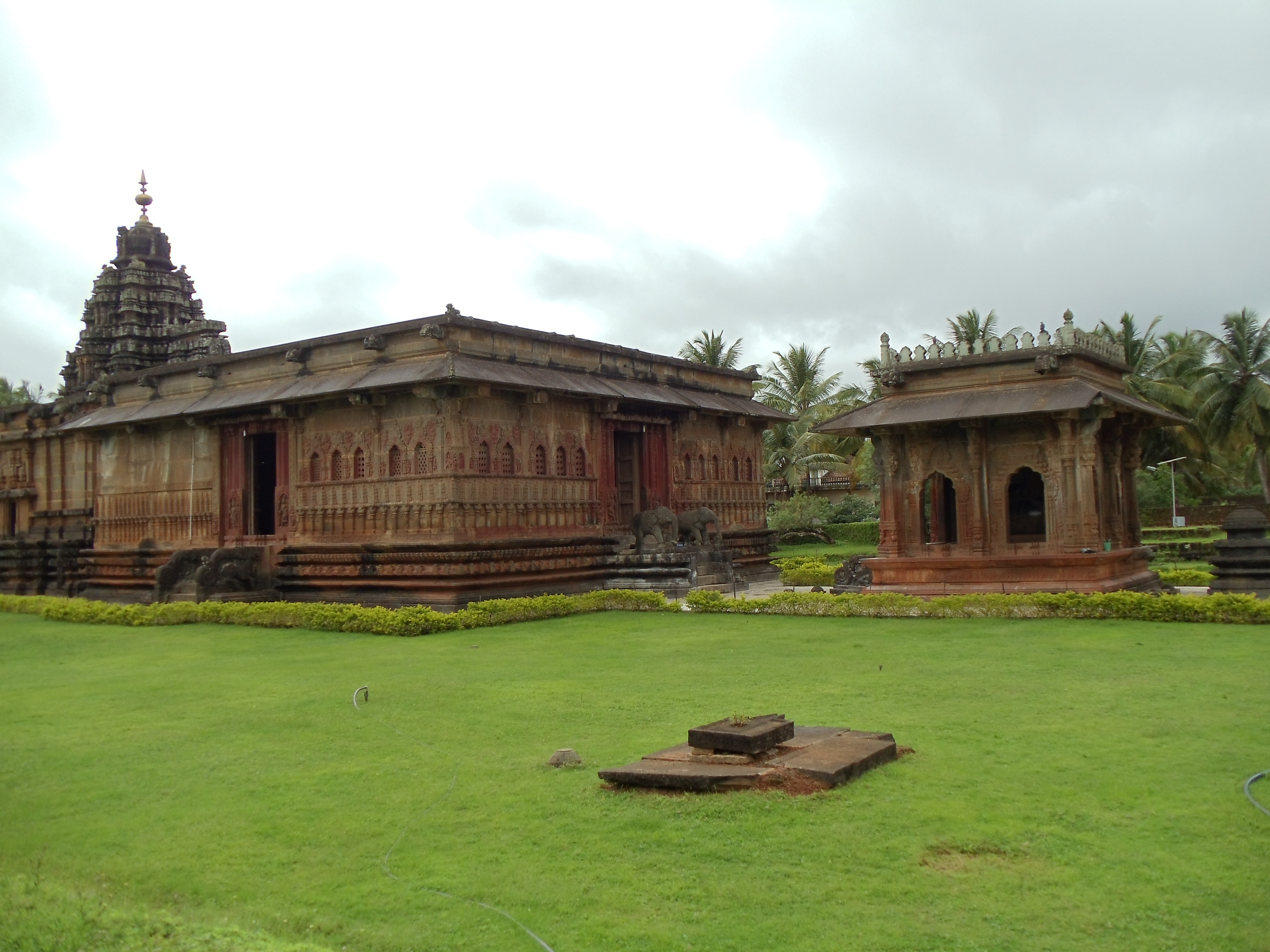
Aghoreshwara temple at Ikkeri

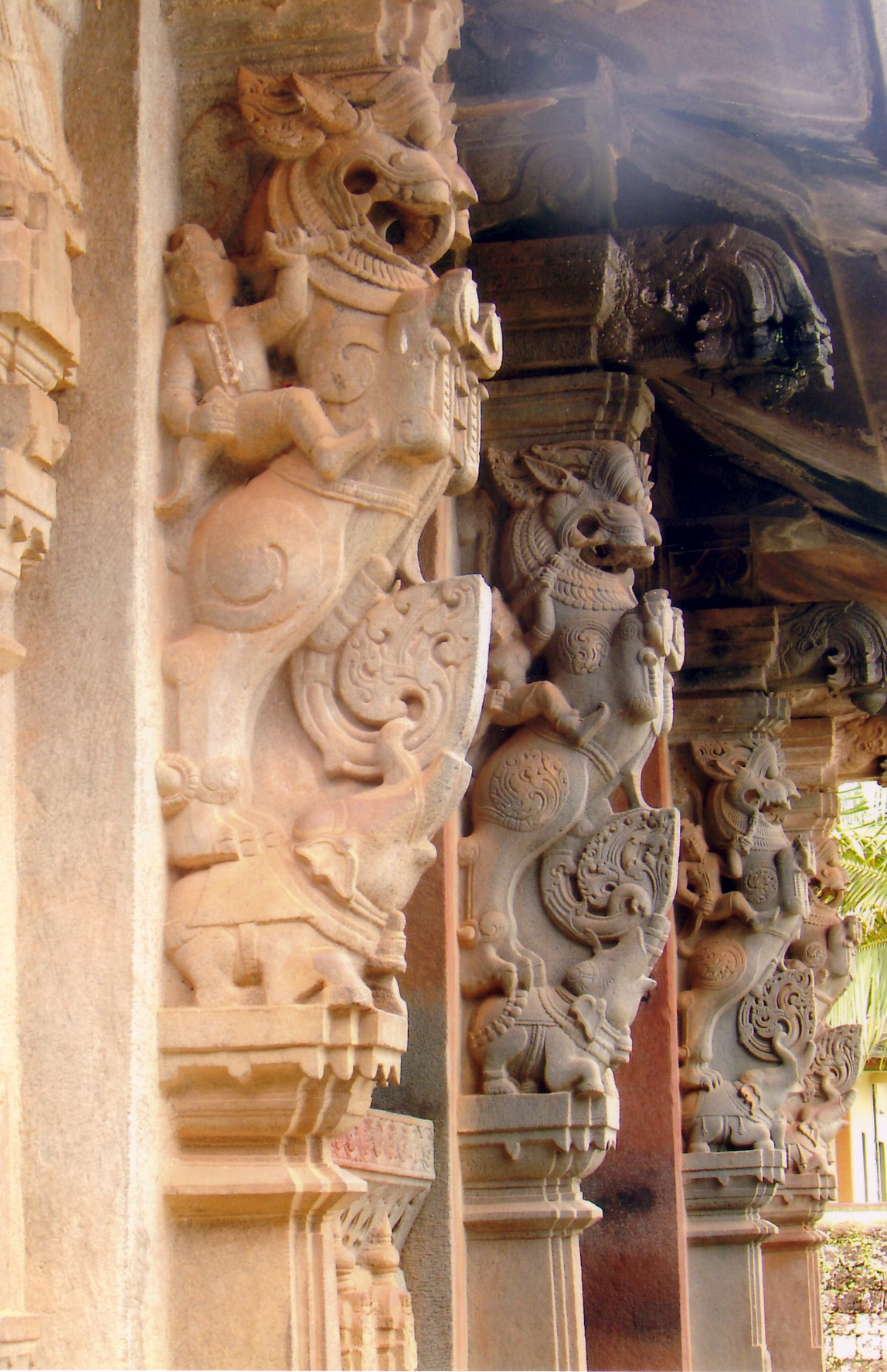
Yali pillars in Aghoreshwara temple at Ikkeri

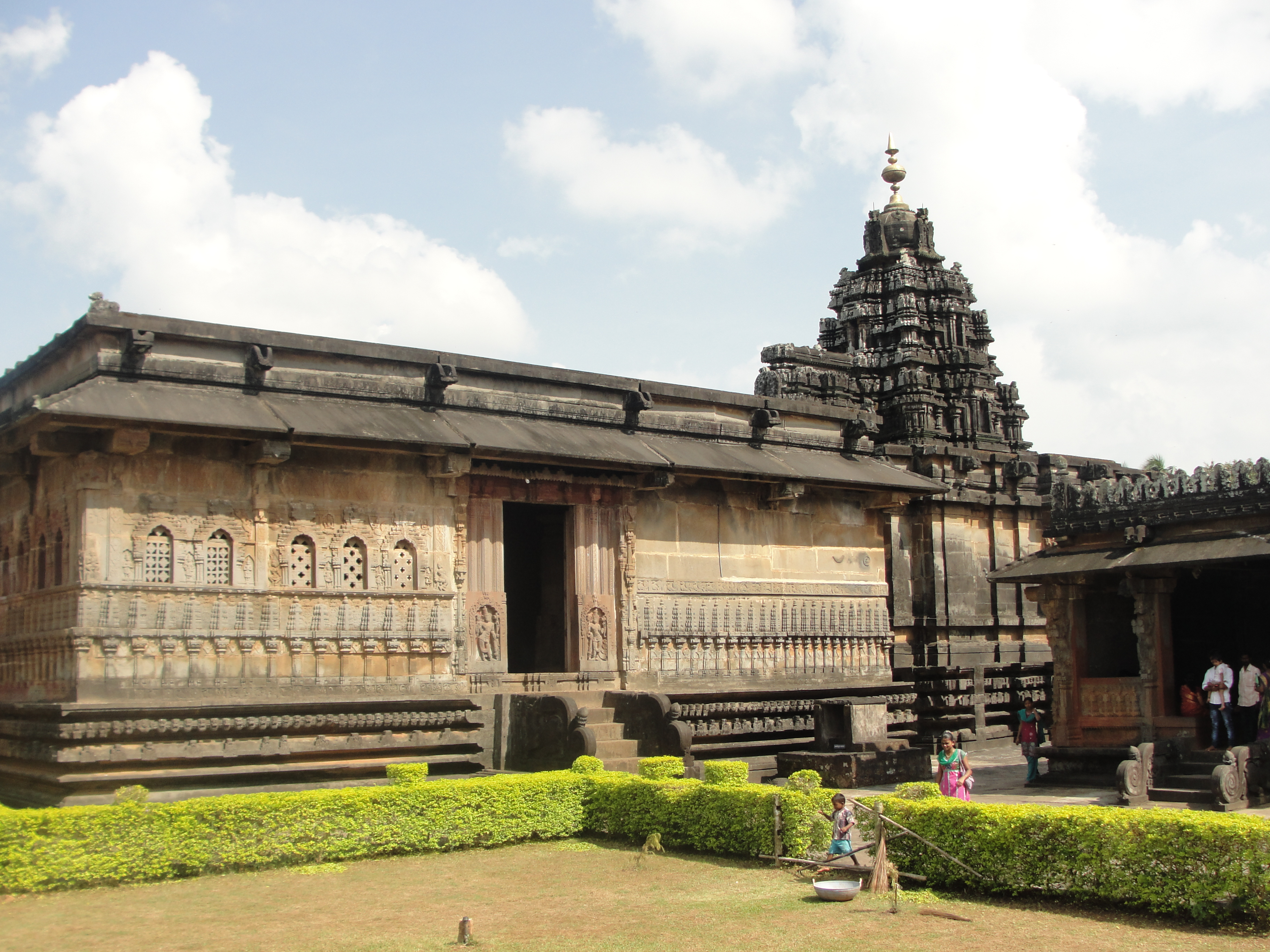
Ikkeri temple Karnataka

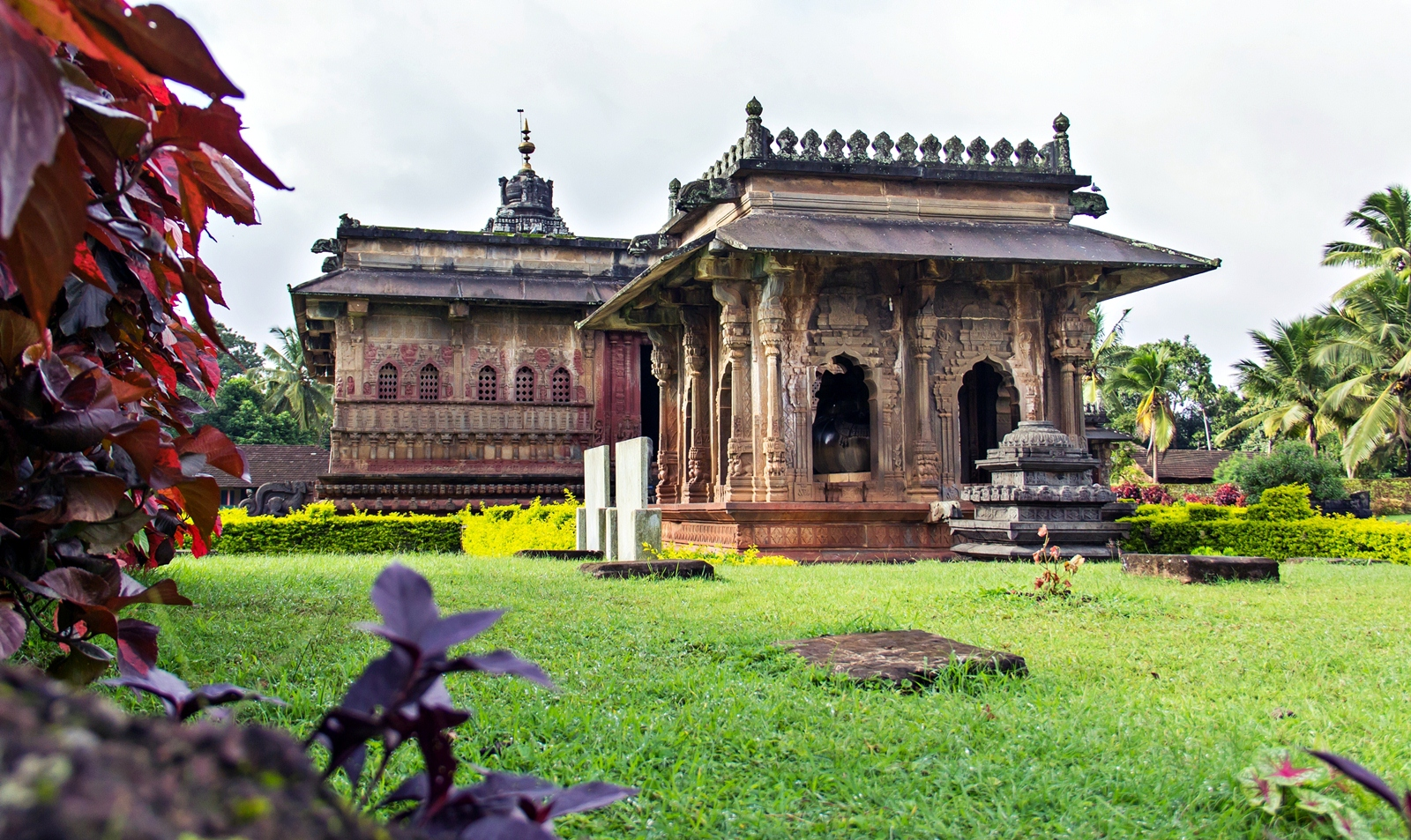
The wide and beautiful Aghoreshwara Temple

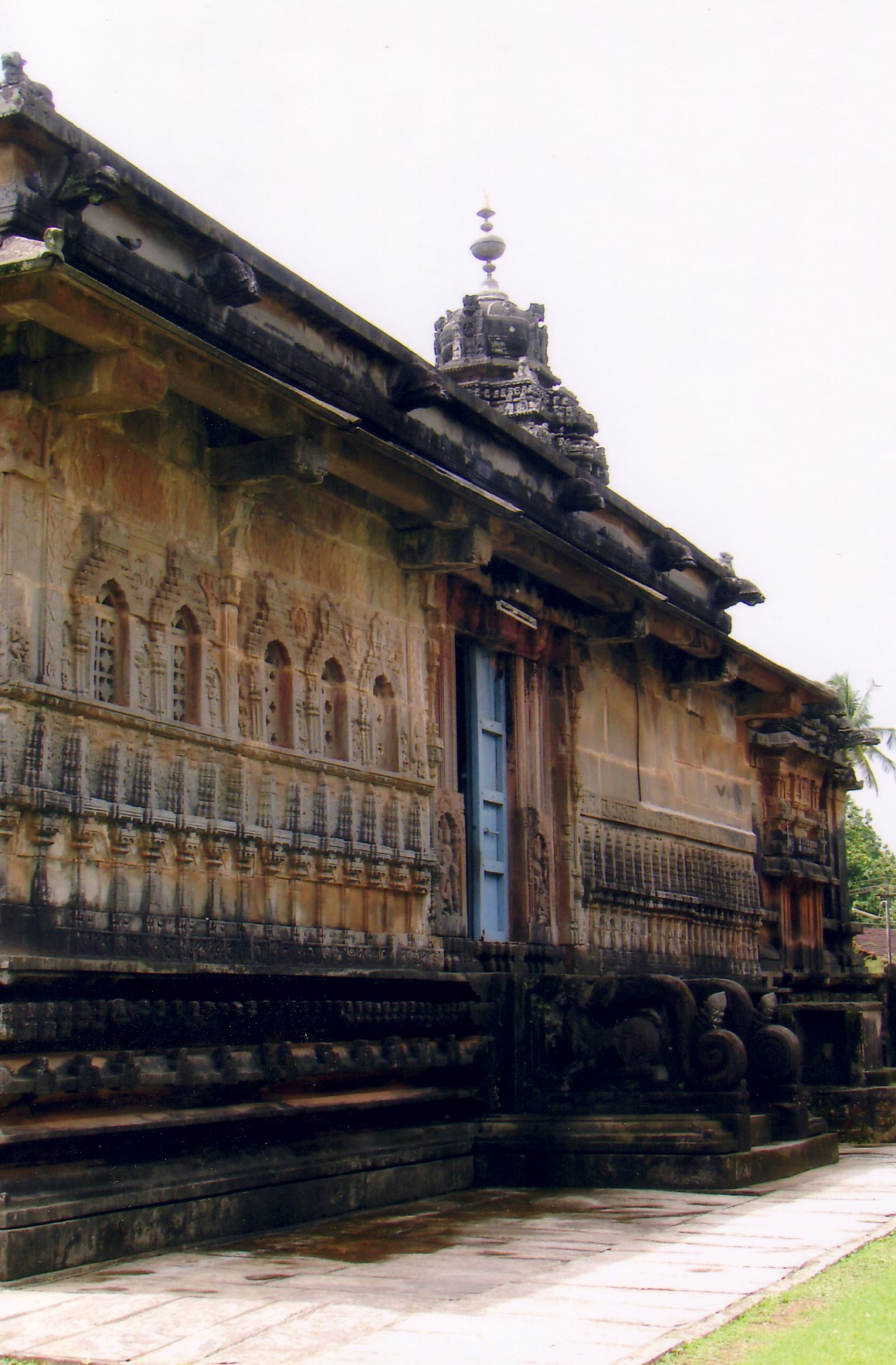
Profile of Aghoreshwara Temple

== See also ==
- Keladi
- Keladi Nayaka
- Vijayanagara Empire
- Karnataka
