= Varadapura =

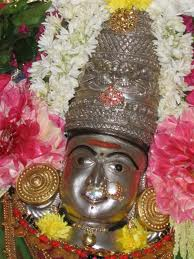
- Shri Sridhara Swami Shrine

- Location in Karnataka

Religion
- Affiliation: Hinduism
- District: Shimoga
- Deity: Shri Sri Sridhara Swami

Location
- Location: Sagara, Karnataka
- State: Karnataka
- Country: India
- Coordinates: 14°7′32″N 74°59′15″E

Specifications
- Temple: 1
- Elevation: 580 m (1,903 ft)

Website
- https://sridharashrama.org/

Varadapura also known as Varadahalli is a small village in Karnataka located in the taluk of Sagara, Karnataka, India. It is notable for the hill shrine of Shri Sridhara Swami Ashram. This Shrine is 6 km from Centre of Sagara, 72 km from Shimoga, 352 km from Bangalore and 800 km from Mumbai.

== Geography ==
Latitude 14.78 North, Longitude 74.59 East and Elevation = 580 Meters Above MSL. Here is a 360 Panorama View from the temple.

== About Shrine ==
Saint Shri Shridhara Swami also referred to as "Bhagwan Sadguru Shri Shridhar Swami Maharaj" who lived here and spent his last few years of his life preaching the Dharma and some of his principles to his disciples and led the foundation for this Shrine.

This Shrine consists of Samadhi, Gynan Mandir, Dharma Sthamba, Goshala, Shridhar Teertha. Varadahalli is a small village surrounded by picturesque location, near Sagara City, Karnataka. Varadahalli, also called as Varadpura is well known for a famous Mutt (Ashram) called Sridhara Swami Mutt. It is famous for the Samadhi of Sri Sridhara Swami one of the great saints of 20th century.

Sri Sridhara Swami lived at Varadahalli and spent his last years before going into the Samadhi.

The main places of attraction in the temple premises are:

Sri Sridhara Swamiji's Samadhi Temple with the cave where Swamiji used to stay during his solitude.

Dharma Stambha with the Dharma Dhwaj which is located at the top of the mountain and is 30 feet in height.

Sanskrit Pathshala named after Swamiji where the students learn the Vedas, the Upanishads and the related spiritual literature.

Goshala which houses around 250 cows.

Shreedhar Teertha

Shreedhar Teertha is a continuous source of holy water running 24 hours a day formed by Shreedhar Swamiji, no one knows the origin of water and there is a pool constructed here to store the holy water. It is believed that this water will run with purity till the existence of the earth. It is also believed that by taking a dip in this holy water, most skin related diseases get cured.
