= Dabbe Falls (Sagara) =

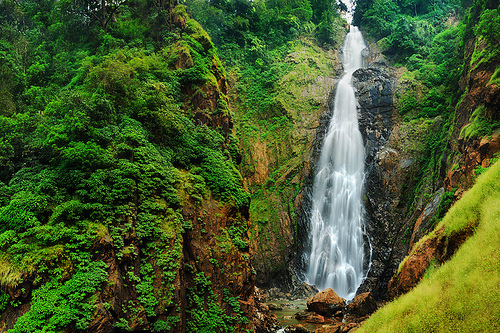
- Location: Shimoga district, Malenadu, Karnataka, India
- Coordinates: 14.1477°N 74.7446°E

Dabbe Falls is a waterfall located in place named Dabbe near Hosagadde in Sagar taluk, Shivamogga District in Karnataka state, India. The height of the falls is 110 meters. One can take a guide from Muppane nature camp which is 10 km away from Dabbe Falls.

It located on the Sagar to Bhatkal route (35 km from Sagar), and the nearest railway station is Talguppa.

== See also ==
- List of waterfalls
- List of waterfalls in India
