= Talaguppa =

- village
- Location in Karnataka, India Talaguppa (India)
- Coordinates: 14.215°N 74.912°E
- Country: India
- State: Karnataka
- District: Shivamogga
- Subdivision: Sagara
- Region: Malenadu

Government
  - Body: Village Panchayat

Languages
  - Official: Kannada
- Time zone: UTC+5:30 (IST)
- PIN: 577 430
- Telephone code: 0818321
- ISO 3166 code: IN-KA
- Vehicle registration: KA-15 (Sagara)
- Website: karnataka.gov.in

Talaguppa or Taalaguppa is a village located in Sagara Taluk in Karnataka State, India. The National Highway No.69 (Bengaluru - Honnavara) passes through Talaguppa village. The village is 14.37 km from the taluk's center Sagara, 77.68 km from Shivamogga, and 373 km from Bengaluru. It is located at a distance of 14 km from Jog Falls, the highest waterfall in India and Talaguppa is the linking Railway terminus for Jog falls. Areca nut and paddy are the most grown crops. Main reserve station of electricity generated from jogfalls and linganamakki dam located here.

== Shrines ==
There are three major temples in this village.

- Shree Kadambeshwar temple
- Shree Veerabhadreshwar temple
- Shree Ranganath temple
- Shree Chaudeshwari Temple Yadavakeri

There is a mosque as well as a church near Travellers Bungalow.

Nearby villages are Kanle (5.294 km), Shiravanthe (7.201 km), Syduru (7.446 km), Masuru (11.78 km), Keladi (11.82 km), Sagara city (14.37 km), Malve (15.26 km).

== Transport ==
Talaguppa is connected by Rail from Bengaluru and Shivamogga and connecting point to Jog Falls. After the broad gauge conversion, Indian railways has introduced a daily train in betweenMysuru Talaguppa, and Mysuru - Talaguppa Bengaluru - Talaguppa Express, Shivamogga Town - Talaguppa Passenger. Intercity express.

The metre gauge railway track between the town of Shivamogga and Talaguppa was laid by the British in 1938. In 1939, Mirza Ismail took the maiden journey on this line to visit the city of Sagara. This rail link provided access to Jog Falls, which is 12 km from Talaguppa. Famous personalities like Nalvadi Krishnaraja Wodeyar, Jayachamarajendra Wodeyar, Sir M Visvesvaraya, Lal Bahadur Shastri and Morarji Desai used this line to reach Jog Falls.

There is a proposal to connect Talaguppa with Honnavara in Uttara Kannada district by a new railway line, which will be a shorter alternate rail route between Mumbai and southern India.

Karnataka State Road Transport Corporation and private bus services are available to Talaguppa.
