= Sagara, Karnataka =

Sagara Sagar Sagar Jambagaru
- City
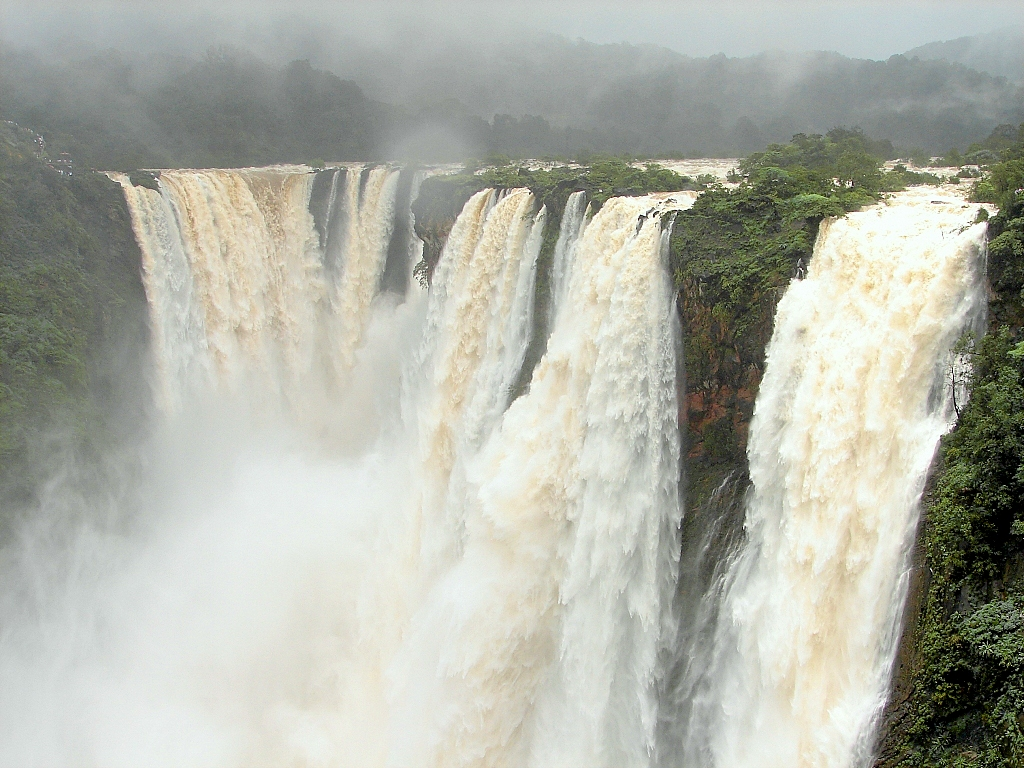
- Jog Falls, Sagara

- Location in Karnataka, India
- Coordinates: 14.1667°N 75.0333°E
- Country: India
- State: Karnataka
- Region: Malenadu
- District: Shivamogga
- Subdivision: Sagara
- Founder: Sadashiva Nayaka

Government
  - Type: Democratic
  - Body: City Municipal Council

Area
  - City: 19.75 km^{2} (7.63 sq mi)
  - Rural: 1,771.11 km^{2} (683.83 sq mi)
- Elevation: 579 m (1,900 ft)

Population (2011)
  - City: 54,550
  - Density: 7,160/km^{2} (18,500/sq mi)
  - Rural: 140,922

Languages
  - Official: Kannada
- Time zone: UTC+5:30 (IST)
- PIN: 577401
- Telephone code: 08183
- Vehicle registration: KA-15
- Literacy: 90.69 %
- Sex ratio: 1013 ♂/♀
- Website: www.sagaracity.mrc.gov.in

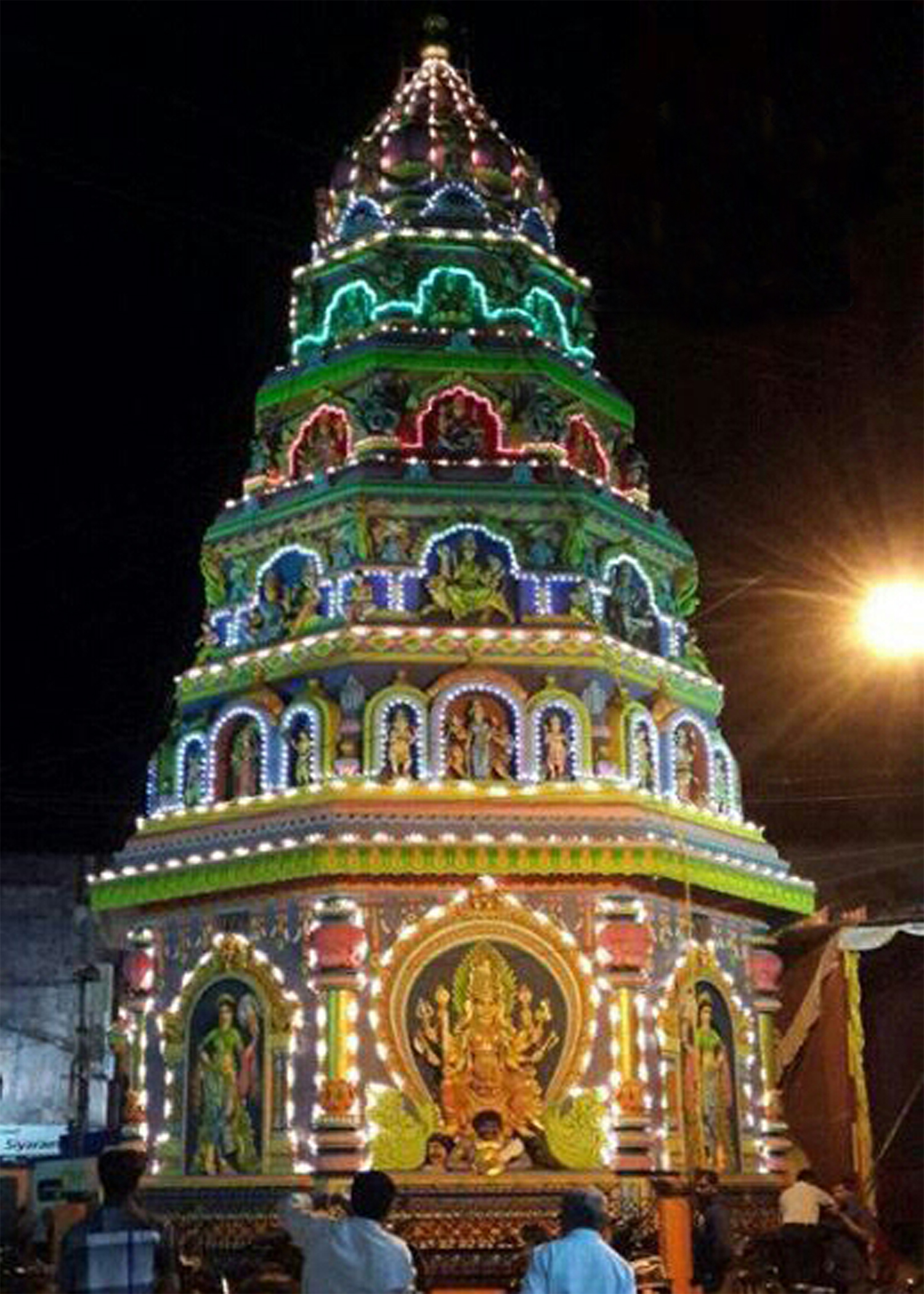
Sagar Marikamba Temple

Sāgara is a city located in the Indian state of Karnataka. It is also a sub divisional and a taluk headquarters. Located in the Sahyadri Mountain range on the banks of river Varada, it is known for its proximity to Jog Falls and to the historical places of Ikkeri, Keladi and Varadamoola. The river Varada originates near Varada-moola. Sagara subdivision consists of Sagara, Soraba, Hosanagara and Shikaripur taluks.

== City Municipal Council ==
Sagara city is one of the 74 Karnataka Municipal Reforms Project (KMRP) City in Karnataka. Sagara ULB was started in 1931 and became a City Municipal Council (CMC) grade two in the year 2007. The ULB consist of 31 wards with the respective number of councillors. The population of the city was 54,550 at the 2011 census and total area is 19.71 sq. km.

== Etymology ==
Sagara derives its name from Sadashiva Sagara. Sadashiva Nayaka, ruler of Keladi dynasty built a lake in between Keladi and Ikkeri. Sadashiva Sagara is now called Ganapathi Kere (Ganapathi Lake). It is a subdivisional headquarters headed by a subdivisional magistrate and Fifth additional District Magistrate.

== Economy ==
The economy of Sagara is mainly driven by areca nut (betel nut), paddy, spice and forest products trade. Betel nut is the major cash crop grown in the area. Along with areca nut, spices like pepper, clove, cinnamon, nutmeg, and cocoa are grown. The economy of the city is highly volatile and is dependent on the variation in the pricing of these agriculture products. Sagara APMC is one of the main market for areca nut in Karnataka.

Sagara has a relatively high number of Gudigars – families that for generations have been engaged in sandalwood and ivory carving. The Gudigar men make idols, figurines and knickknacks like penholders, agarbathi stands, cuff links, photo frames and paper clips; the women are adept at making garlands and wreaths out of thin layers of scraped sandalwood.

== Demographics ==
At the 2001 census, Sagara had a population of 50,115. Males constituted 50% of the population and females 50%. Sagara had an average literacy rate of 79%, higher than the national average of 59.5%: male literacy was 82%, and female literacy was 75%. In Sagar, 11% of the population was under 6 years of age. At the 2011 census its population exceeded 54,550.

== Transport ==
=== By Road ===
From the state capital Bengaluru, Sagara can be reached by travelling on NH-48 upto Tumkur, NH-73 upto Banavara and then on NH-69. KSRTC, the state government transport, runs several buses from Bangalore, including premium Airavat class and night services. Sagara is around 360 km (224 mi) by road from Bengaluru. From the coastal side, Sagara is accessible by road through Agumbe Ghat or Hulikal Ghat roads. Bus service is provided by KSRTC and several private bus operators. Sagara is well connected by road with major cities and towns of Coastal Karnataka, and most parts of interior Karnataka, except for the Northeast. It is an important bus junction. From November 2013, KSRTC introduced city buses in Sagara city.

=== By railway ===
Sagara has its own railway station, known as Sagara Jambagaru (station code: SRF). There are express passenger trains that connect Sagara with Bengaluru and Mysuru and a rural passenger train between Shivamogga to Talaguppa passing through Sagara.

=== By air ===
The nearest airport is Shivamogga Airport, which is about 78 km from Sagara and the nearest international airport is Mangalore Airport.

== Education ==
Sagara has a number of government and private institutions which offer many courses in post metric, bachelor's degree and post graduation.

== TV and radio ==
Sagara has an LPT-49 TV relay station airing Doordarshan national channel. Cable TV and direct to home services are widely used and these have replaced the conventional VHF/UHF TV antennas and satellite dish antennas. Digital cable is also available with Shikhara TV, which provides essential day to day information to the people of Sagara. Sagara has an FM radio station airing FM Rainbow (100.1 MHz)

== Tourism ==
Tourist sites are indicated by milestones and hoardings which are usually in Kannada and English.

=== Keladi Nayaka Dynasty related ===
Shree Marikamba Temple, Sagara

The Marikamba Temple is located in Sagara City, in the Indian state of Karnataka. It features the image of the goddess shree Marikamba, a form of Durga or Parvati. The temple was built in the center of the city during the reign of Venkatappa Nayak who ruled over Keladi and Ikkeri kingdom during the 16th century. Marikamba was the family deity of the Nayaka dynasty.

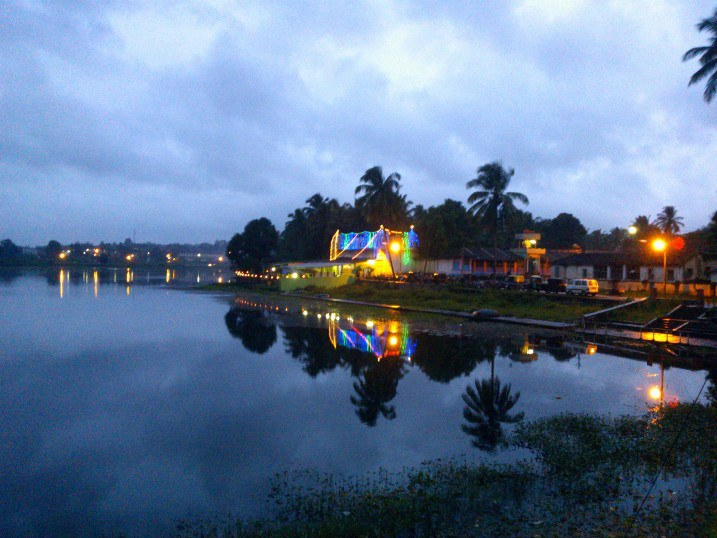
Historical lake - Ganapathi Kere in Sagara City 360 Panorama View

Keladi

Keladi has a shree Rameshwara temple of historical importance is located 6 km from the city. One has to take a diversion at Sorab Road. There is a museum containing old manuscripts written during the Keladi dynasty.

Ikkeri

Ikkeri is a place is of historic importance due to the presence of a temple dedicated to Lord Shiva. Which was once invaded by Jihadi islaamic troop, and they destroyed the 16 shouldered (Baahus) ancient Shree Aghoreshwara idol and some other idols. After that also not satisfied those terrorists looted the wealth of the temple and forcibly brought the many tonnes weighted golden kalasa also to the mosque of Bhatkal (chinnada palli) after that the mosque of Bhatkal was called as chinnada palli as came to known in history. One has to take a diversion at B. H. Road and travel 6 km.

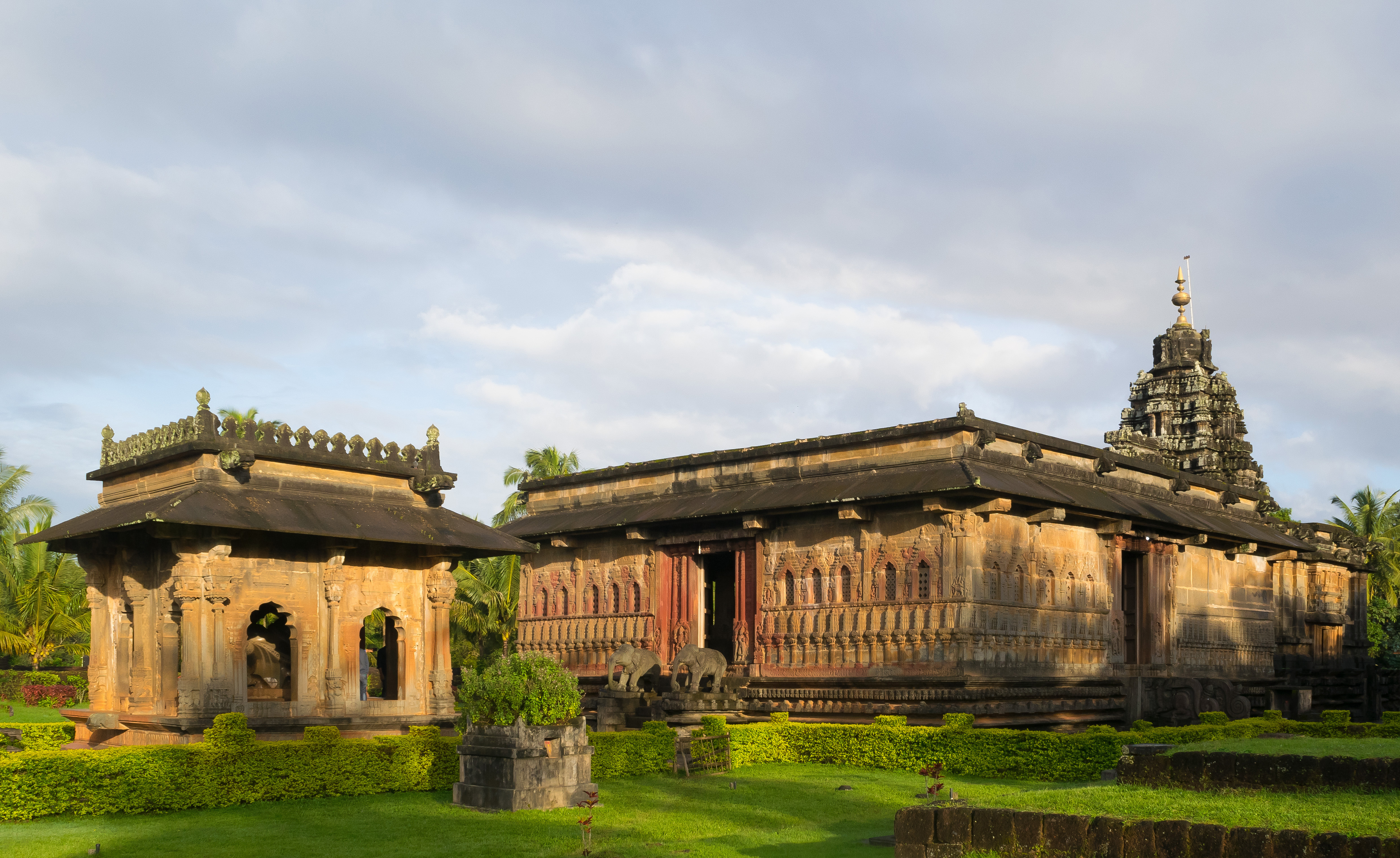
Aghoreshwara Temple

=== Nature tourism ===
==== Jog Falls ====
Jog Falls is in Sagar taluk and is created by the Sharavathi River. It is approximately 30 km by National Highway 69 (NH-206 as per old NH numbering system). Jog falls is located 30 km from Sagara. It is also known as Gerusoppa Falls or Jogada Gundi in Kannada. It is the second-highest plunge waterfall in India. The drive from Sagara to Jog falls is scenic and lush with greenery all around, clouds and mist floating among the green hills is a typical sight. July–August is the best time to visit Jog falls.

==== Honnemaradu ====
Honnemaradu is situated on the banks of the backwaters of the Sharavati river. A big water mass extends up to the Chakra dam. It is about 35 km from Sagara city towards Jog and 10 km from Talaguppa. Indian Institute For Adventure Applications is a training school situated here which uses adventure as a platform for learning.

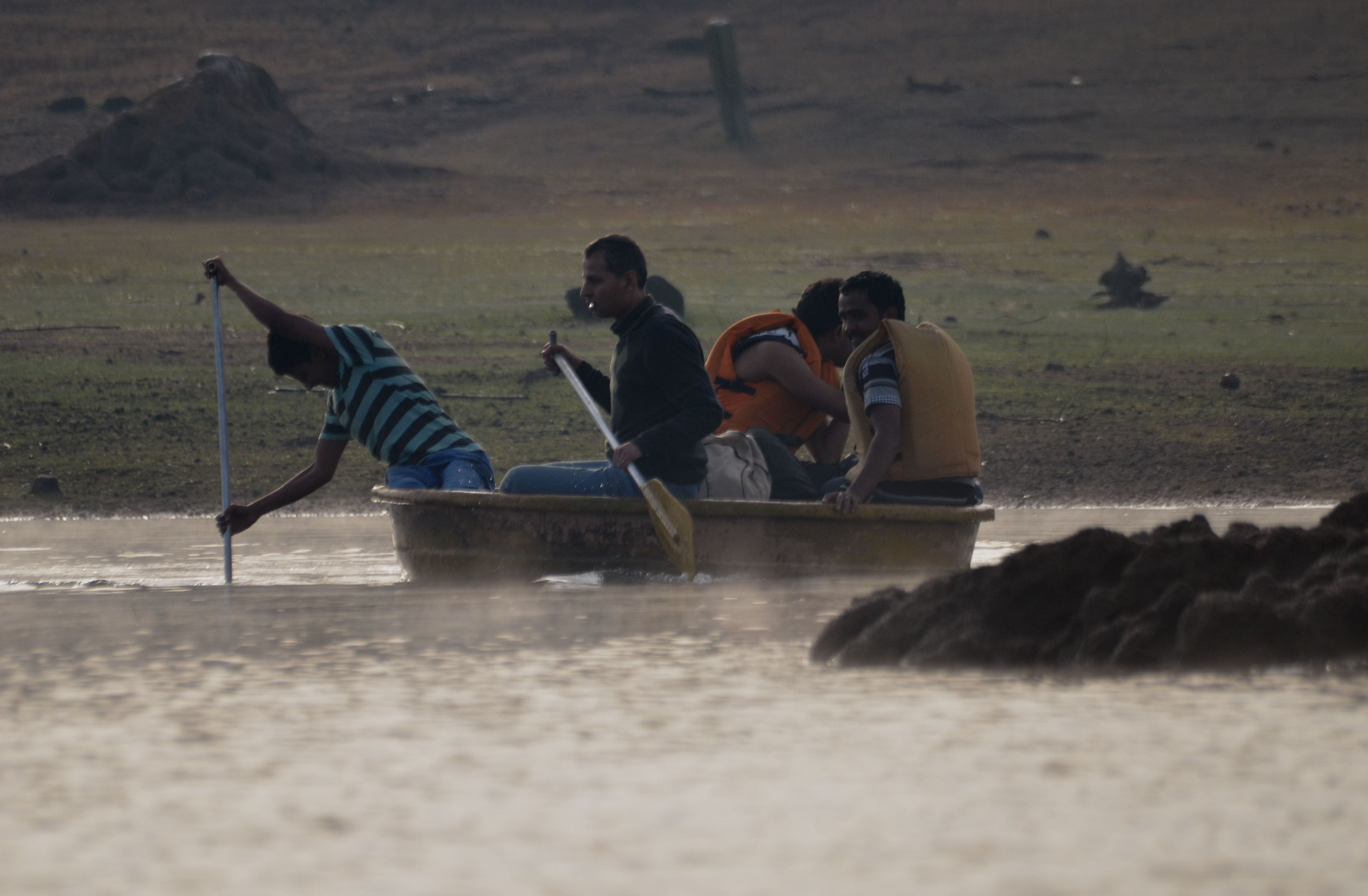
Boating at Honnemaradu

==== Holebaagilu ====
Holebaagilu is situated on the banks of the Sharavati River about 30 km from Sagar. One has to take a diversion from B. H. Road towards Ikkeri Road to get there. The Sharavati backwaters of Linganamakki dam has submerged acres of land. It is in Kolur Grama Panchayat limits. One has to take a flatboat to get across the backwaters to reach the other side where Sigandooru is.

==== Sharavati Wildlife Sanctuary ====
Sharavati Wildlife Sanctuary is in Sagar Taluk, Karnataka. It is 350 km from Bangalore. Located near Jog Falls, the sanctuary covers the Sharavati Valley Region, near the western border of Karnataka. It is spread over an area of 431 km. The sanctuary is nourished by the Sharavati River. Linganamakki reservoir spread over an area of 128.7 km is a part of this sanctuary.

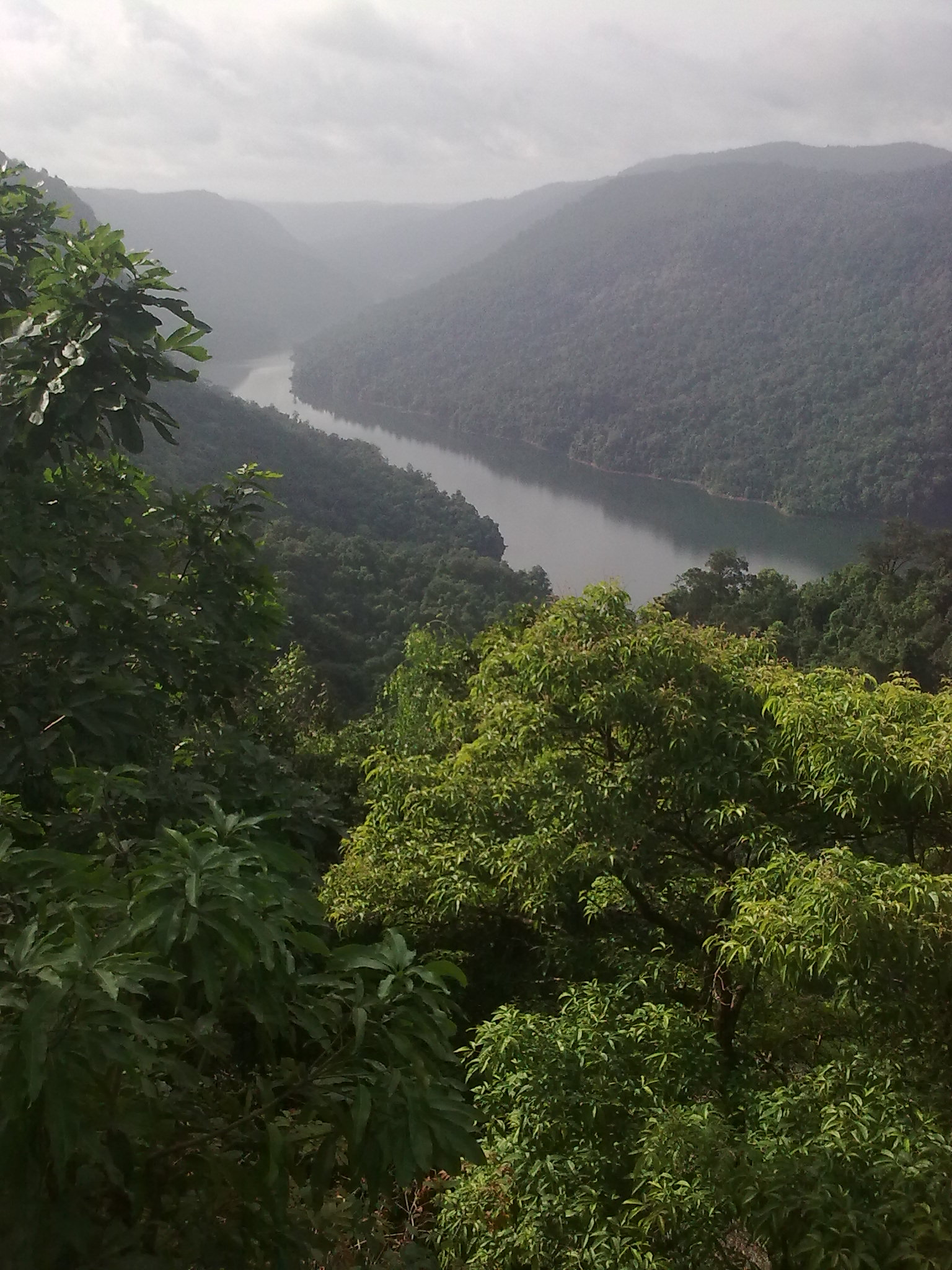
Wildlife near Sagar

==== Linganamakki dam ====
Linganamakki dam is built across the Sharavathi river and is 6 km from Jog Falls in Sagara taluk. It is the main feeder reservoir for the Mahatma Gandhi hydro-electric project. It has two power generating units of 27.5 MW

==== Dabbe Falls ====
Dabbe Falls is located near Hosagadde in Sagar taluk. On the road from Sagara to Bhatkal, Hosagadde lies about 20 km from the town of Kargal. From Hosagadde a walk of 6–8 km into the forest leads to Dabbe Falls.

=== Places of worship ===
==== Sigandooru ====
Sigandooru is a holy place of Goddess Shree Chaudeshwari. A large temple of Goddess Chaudeshwari is here. This Goddess is a highly believed deity in Sagar and the surrounding taluks as a protector against theft and robbery. Coupons for entry will be distributed on first-come, first-served basis.

==== Varadapura ====
Varadahalli, also known as Vaddalli, is an area located 6 km from the city, where one has to take a diversion from Jog Road after the end of the city limits. It is known for the samadhi of Sri Sridhara Swami, who is one of the prominent 20th century saints of the region.

==== Kalasi ====
Kalase or Nadakalasi or Nadakalase is a small village about 8 kilometers away from Sagara in Shivamogga district of Karnataka. One has to travel along Sorab Road for 6 km and take a diversion. Hidden in its densely populated flora and fauna is a temple complex from the Hoysala times. Baleyanna Vergade (Heggade), a local ruler who had accepted the mighty Hoysalas as the overseeing authority of his regions during that time, has constructed two temples next to each other in 1218 AD, during the rule of Veera Ballala II. The temples are a mix of Hoysala and Dravidian temple architectures, but the Hoysala influences are there to be seen in abundance.

The larger of the two temples is the Mallikarjuna Temple dedicated to the Mallikarjuna Shiva Linga in its only sanctum sanctorum. A highlight of this temple are the smooth looking lathe turned pillars inside. The main shikhara is of Kadamba Nagara style.

The Rameshwara Temple at Nadakalasi is less extravagant, but equally well decorated, and has, to its credit, a Sala slaying the lion statue next to its Shikhara. The main deity is the Rameshwara Linga, but it has been referred to as Sadashiva in the past.

Nadakalasi's closeness to Sagara hasn't ensured its visibility on the tourist map, although, equally closer towns of Keladi and Ikkeri enjoy better recall among visitors.

==== Varadamoola ====
Varadamoola is 6 km from Sagara City. River Varada originates at this place. Varada flows through the town of Banavasi before joining Tungabhadra.

==== Shettisara ====
This place has a Shani temple and Laxminarayana Temple.

==== Ganapathi temple ====
This temple forms a unique feature of Sagara. It is situated beside the Ganapathi lake, where temple and mosque stand side by side, symbolizing social harmony amongst the people of Sagara.

St Joseph's Church

== Major roads passing through Sagara taluk ==
- National Highways:
  - NH-69 (NH-206 as per old national highway numbering system) Bengaluru -Honnavar road.
- State Highways:
  - SH-50 passes through Jog, Mavinagundi, Siddapur, Chandragutti, Sorab.
  - SH-62 passes through Siralakoppa and Sagar.
  - SH-77 passes through Sorab, Masur, Sagar, Hosanagar.

== Rare disorders ==
=== Handigodu syndrome ===
Handigodu joint disease (HJD) is a familial skeletal disorder. Handigodu, near Sagara is one of only two places in the world where this disorder is to be found – the other being northern Zululand, South Africa. Severe precocious, progressive degenerative osteoarthropathy causes marked physical handicap by adulthood. The clinical and radiological manifestations are very similar to MJD (Mseleni joint disease) and they are sometimes believed to be the same entity.

=== Kyasanur Forest disease ===
Kyasanur Forest disease, also known as Monkey Disease is a rare endemic tick-borne viral haemorrhagic fever which was first noticed in the Kattinakere village, near Sorab which is in the Kyasanur forest range.

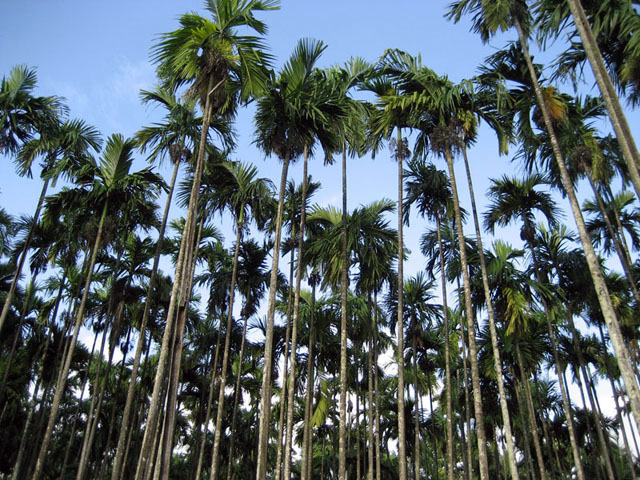
Arecanut Palm at the Plantation

== Notable people from Sagara ==
- Raghaveshwara Bharathi- Ramachandrapura Mutt Pontiff and Guru of Havyakas.
- Diganth, Kannada film actor
- Bharat Chipli, former cricketer who played for Karnataka and Deccan Chargers
- Archana Udupa, singer
- K. V. Subbanna, Magsaysay award winner
- Shantaveri Gopala Gowda, leader of socialist movement
- Na D'Souza, novel writer
- Arun Sagar, theatre artist and Big Boss Kannada, season 1 runner up
- Kagodu Thimmappa- He was a part of Kagodu Chaluvali and ex Revenue Minister of Karnataka Legislative Assembly
- H. Ganapathiyappa- Leader of the Kagodu Satyagraha.
