= Lingaa =

2014 film by K. S. Ravikumar

- Theatrical release poster
- Directed by: K. S. Ravikumar
- Screenplay by: K. S. Ravikumar
- Story by: Pon Kumaran
- Produced by: Rockline Venkatesh
- Starring: Rajinikanth; Anushka Shetty; Sonakshi Sinha; Jagapathi Babu
- Cinematography: R. Rathnavelu
- Edited by: Samjith Mohammed
- Music by: A. R. Rahman
- Production company: Rockline Entertainments
- Distributed by: Eros International; Vendhar Movies
- Release date: 12 December 2014
- Running time: 174 minutes
- Country: India
- Language: Tamil
- Budget: ₹100 crore
- Box office: ₹154 crore

Lingaa is a 2014 Indian Tamil-language action drama film written and directed by K. S. Ravikumar and produced by Rockline Venkatesh under Rockline Entertainments. It stars Rajinikanth in a dual role alongside, Anushka Shetty, Sonakshi Sinha and Jagapathi Babu, while Santhanam and Karunakaran play supporting roles. The music was composed by A. R. Rahman, while cinematography and editing were handled by R. Rathnavelu and Samjith Mohammed. In the film, Lingaa, a petty thief, arrives at Solaiyur to save the village's dam and temple, which was built by his grandfather Raja Lingeswaran.

Lingaa marks the reunion of Rajinikanth and K. S. Ravikumar since Padayappa (1999). Principal photography commenced on 1 May 2014 in Mysore. The majority of the filming took place in Ramoji Film City and Annapurna Studios, with a few scenes in Chennai. The film's flashback portions were shot at various locations in Karnataka and the climax portions were filmed at Linganamakki Dam and Jog Falls in Shimoga. The film's shooting was completed within six months.

Made on a budget of ₹100 crore, Lingaa was released on 12 December 2014, coinciding with Rajinikanth's birthday. The film was dubbed and released in Telugu and Hindi languages with the same name. The film received mixed reviews from critics. The film was the highest-grossing Tamil film of 2014, highest-grossing South Indian film of 2014 and one of the highest grossing Indian films of 2014; despite this, the film suffered major losses due to high production and distribution costs, causing protests by distributors.

== Plot ==
In the small village of Solaiyur, the Solaiyur Dam is a symbol of hope and prosperity for the villagers. However, the corrupt MP Nagabooshan wants to destroy the dam and build a new one to get millions from the construction contract. When a dedicated dam inspector refuses to report it as unfit, Nagabooshan kills the inspector. In his dying moments, the inspector manages to hide a pen drive with the inspection report in an abandoned temple and warns the village head, Karunakara, to open the temple. Karunakara firmly believes that only the descendant of Raja Lingeswaran, the noble builder of the dam, can open the temple. Thus, he sets out on a mission to find his descendants. Lakshmi, Karunakara's granddaughter and a journalist, takes up the responsibility to locate the descendant.

Lakshmi's search leads her to Lingaa, a witty and cunning thief; he hates his grandfather for having left his family penniless. Lingaa initially refuses to get involved, but he's trapped by Lakshmi to accompany her to Solaiyur. To his surprise, the villagers welcome Lingaa with great joy and celebration. Karunakara reveals a secret about the temple's lingam – it is made of an extremely valuable emerald stone. Tempted by the wealth it holds, Lingaa hatches a plan to steal it. However, his scheme is thwarted when he is caught by a diligent security guard. In a stroke of quick thinking, Lingaa pretends to perform a puja to deceive the villagers.

Karunakara reveals the true history of Raja Lingeswaran, A government officer who was fighting with a freedom fighter and his man in a train. Afterwards giving the warning to them, Lingeswaran who valiantly fought against the British to build the dam for the benefit of Solaiyur.

The British collector talks about sending Raja Lingeswaran to the palace under any situation.Due to the British greed, Lingeswaran was falsely accused after completing the dam and banished from the village. Mani Bharathi, who is in love with Raja Lingeswaran and is involved in dam construction accompanies him. When the villagers found out the truth, they tried to bring Lingeswaran home, but he refused, saying he was satisfied that his work on the dam would last forever. Karunakara's father vowed that until Lingeswaran returned to the village, the temple Lingeswaran built would be closed; Karunakara kept the promise.

Knowing the truth about his grandfather, Lingaa decides to mend his ways, and agrees to help Karunakara save the dam. Nagabooshan tries to carry out his plan by bribing another inspector, but Lingaa, Karunakara, and Lakshmi stand in the way. Lingaa reveals the pen drive the previous inspector hid in the temple, having found it when he broke in. Nagabooshan tries to erase the file, but Lingaa's cohorts have already published it online to ensure the report doesn't disappear. Lingaa also reveals Nagabooshan's plans, having suspected him and had Lakshmi get proof; Nagabooshan is exposed, causing his downfall.

Now desperate, Nagabooshan kidnaps Lakshmi and takes off in a hot air balloon rigged with a bomb to destroy the dam. Lingaa manages to get on the balloon and kick Nagabooshan out, killing him. He also kicks the bomb into the reservoir, saving the dam from destruction. Lingaa prepares to leave the village, wanting to become respectable like his grandfather. However, the police catch up with him, intending to arrest him for his past crimes but ultimately let him go due to his heroic actions. Lakshmi joins Lingaa, and they set off on a new chapter.

== Cast ==
- Rajinikanth as:
  - K. Lingeswaran a.k.a. Lingaa
  - Raja Lingeswaran ICS
- Anushka Shetty as Lakshmi (voiceover by Renuka Kathir)
- Sonakshi Sinha as Mani Bharathi (voiceover by Chinmayi)
- Jagapati Babu as MP Nagabooshan
- K. Viswanath as Karunakara
- Santhanam as Lingaa's sidekick
- Karunakaran as Kothandam, Lingaa's sidekick
- Brahmanandam as Inspector Raja Varman
- Dev Gill as a freedom fighter
- Radha Ravi as Kavi Bharathi
- Vijayakumar as Karunakara's father, a village head
- Nizhalgal Ravi as Zamindar of Rayakottai
- R. Sundarrajan as Sambandham, the collector's spy
- Manobala as train loco pilot in 1939
- Ilavarasu as Sami Pillai, Raja Lingeswaran's right-hand
- Ponvannan as the government official officer
- Jayaprakash as a corrupt government officer
- Madhan Bob as the merchant
- Crane Manohar as the merchant's security guard
- Anu Mohan as Shanmugam
- Vasu Vikram as Nagabooshan's assistant
- William Orendorff as British Governor
- Ravi Mariya as the 5-star hotel manager
- Rajkamal as the 5-star hotel security camera operator
- Ramkumar Ganesan as the 5-star hotel owner
- C. Ranganathan as the 5-star hotel chief security guard
- Kamalesh Kumar as Poet
- Suchithra as Vasantha
- Scissor Manohar as a Police constable
- Padayappa Ramesh as the 5-star hotel security guard
- Erode Soundar as a villager
- S. V. S. Kumar as a villager
- Thaadi Balaji as Lingaa's sidekick
- B. Balaji Shankar as Lingaa's sidekick
- Falk Neumann as Collector Lawrence Hunter
- Lauren J. Irwin as a British collector's wife
- Rajitha as a 5-star hotel guest
- Amritha Aiyer as a villager

=== Cameo Appearances ===
- K.S. Ravikumar as Assistant Commissioner "Finishing" Kumar
- R. Rathnavelu as a man at the bar in the song “Oh Nanba”
- Rockline Venkatesh as a man at the bar in the song "Oh Nanba"

== Production ==
=== Development ===
The script as well as screenplay for Lingaa were penned by Pon Kumaran, who had registered the story with the South Indian Film Writers' Association under the title King Khan in 2010. The story is loosely based on John Penniquick who built Mullaperiyar Dam. He had also penned the dialogues for the film. Pre-production works began in March 2014. The following month, Ravikumar stated on Facebook that filming would commence soon and that the film was titled Lingaa. Rockline Venkatesh was announced as producer. A. R. Rahman was roped in as the music composer for the film and R. Rathnavelu as the cinematographer. Sabu Cyril was confirmed to handle the art direction. Samjith Mhd, who had worked with Ravikumar earlier in Policegiri (2013), was confirmed as the film's editor. Hollywood stuntman Lee Whittaker was recruited to frame the stunt sequences. During the audio launch of the film's soundtrack album, Ravikumar said the title Lingaa was suggested to him by Rajinikanth. Director Ameer earlier had the rights to the title for his next project but handed over the rights to Ravikumar for Rajinikanth.

=== Casting ===
For the female lead roles Anushka Shetty and Sonakshi Sinha were roped to play the roles of Lakshmi and Mani Bharathi respectively. In late April 2014, Telugu actor Jagapati Babu confirmed on his Yahoo messenger and his Yahoo mail that he was signed on for a role in the film. Sudeepa was reported to have refused an important role in the film, but he however denied being approached for the film in the first place. Further, reports circulated again in August 2014 which strongly suggested Sudeep was a part of the cast as he was seen during the canning of the climax portions but he clarified that he wasn't offered a role in the film yet. Comedian Santhanam joined the team in May 2014.

British actress Lauren J. Irwin was selected to appear in the pre-independence portions of the film. American actor, director and writer William Orendorff was selected to play a key role in the film and furthermore, confirming his involvement in the project through Twitter.Sonakshi Sinha, in an interview with Mumbai Mirror, said that there are two different tracks of filming scenes, and that Shetty and her will not share much screen space and was given liberty to pick up the role she felt suitable for her. In June 2014, actor Karunakaran was selected to play a supporting role. Actor Dev Gill was selected to play a secondary antagonist role. Director and comedian Manobala confirmed that he would appear in a small yet significant role as a train driver. Comedian Brahmanandam was selected to portray the role of a police officer.

=== Filming ===
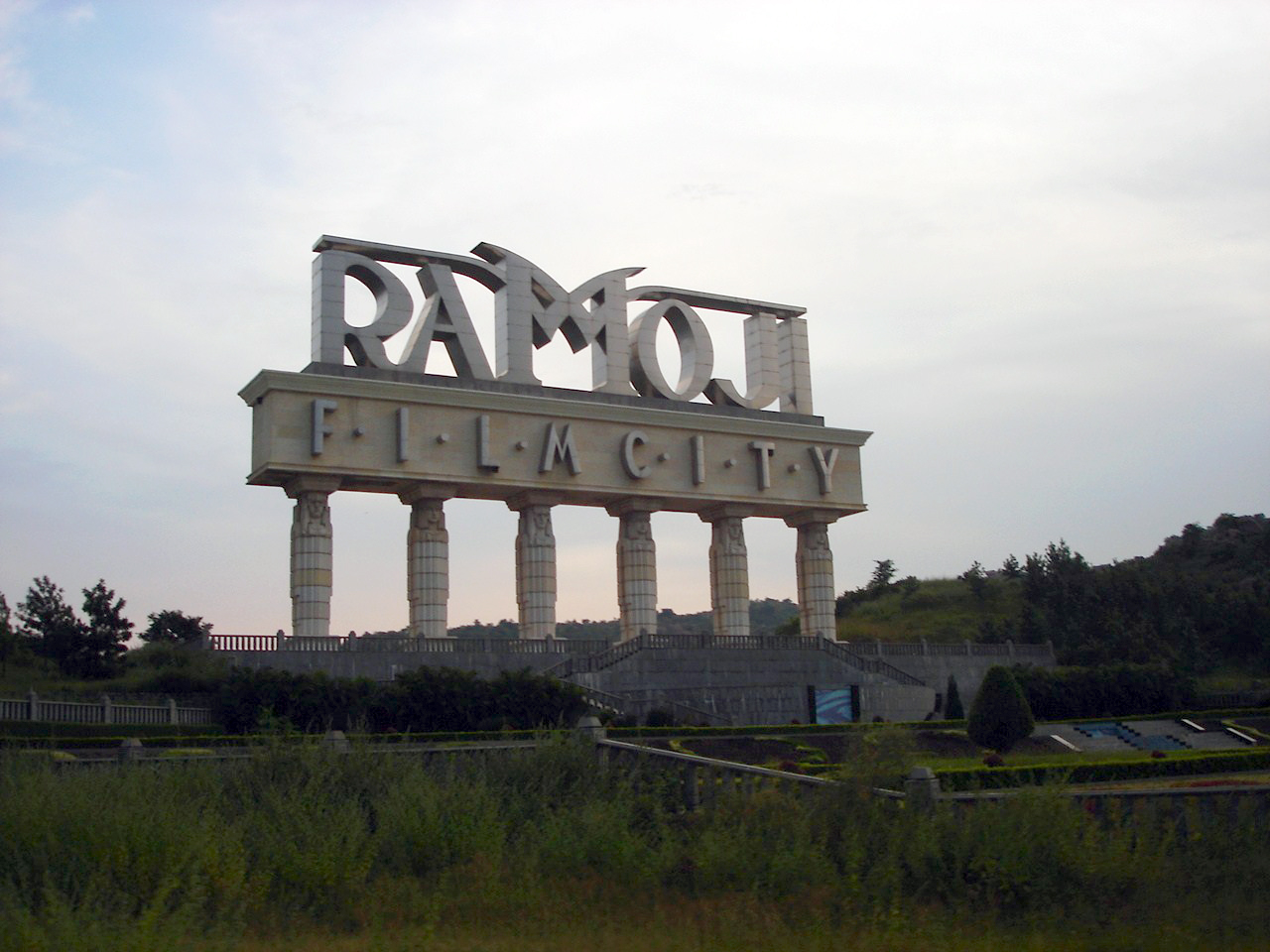
Ramoji Film City, where majority of the filming was done.

Principal photography commenced on 1 May 2014 in Mysuru, Karnataka, India, with a customary Puja ceremony. Rajinikanth and Sonakshi Sinha took part in the shoot. The muhurat shot of the movie was filmed in May 2014 at the Chamundeshwari Temple in Mysuru. Cinematographer R. Rathnavelu revealed that filming would be done using a Red Dragon 6K camera. In addition to this, the Phantom Flex 4K camera was used for filming action sequences. The film crew shot in various locations in Karnataka like Melukote, Manuvana, Pandavapura, Chamundi Hills and inside the residential portion of Mysore Palace. On 10 May 2014, Sonakshi had completed her portions for the first schedule of the film's shooting. On 18 May 2014, Rajinikanth and Sonakshi Sinha shot some scenes dating back to the British era in front of the illuminated residential portion of the palace. Horses were used for the shot. Over 50 policemen and 30 bouncers had been deployed to prevent people from getting near the shooting area in Mysore.

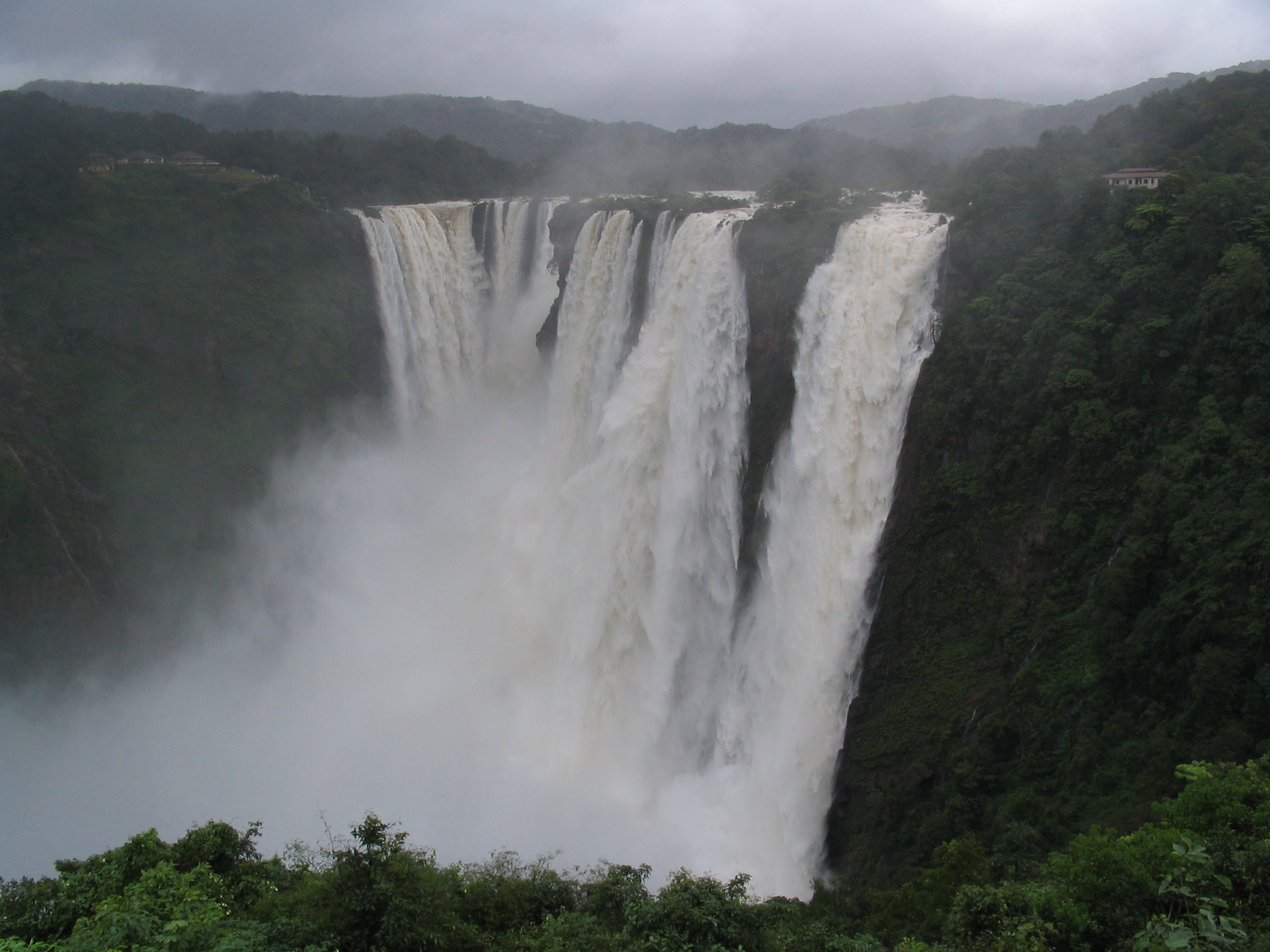
Jog Falls, one of the two main locations where the climax was filmed.

The team then moved to Ramoji Film City, Hyderabad for a two-month schedule, where sequences featuring the entire cast were shot for 50 days. A song sequence featuring Rajinikanth and Anushka was shot at Annapurna Studios, wherein the production team had designed a huge set for the song. On 13 July 2014, actress Sonakshi Sinha completed her filming schedule in Hyderabad. During the Hyderabad schedule, news circulated that Rajinikanth fainted on the sets while filming a heavy action sequence but Ravikumar denied this, citing that the actor was healthy.

Filming later took place in Thirthahalli and the Jog Falls. For the climax, a big statue of Shiva and dam both as set were constructed next to the Jog Falls. Shooting also took place at the Linganamakki Dam. The film's climax requirements accounted for ₹10 million (US$100,000). In September 2014, the climax portion's filming was allotted ten days, confirming the shoot in Karnataka. On 22 September 2014, Whittaker confirmed that the climax portions of the film were completed with a stunt sequence choreographed by him. The film's shooting was wrapped up by 23 September 2014 except filming of two song sequences that were reported to be canned in Chennai and Scotland. Ravikumar stated that the climax scene, which involved a hot air balloon, was inspired by a sequence in Armour of God (1986).

During the Hyderabad schedule of the film, some villagers of Anajpur village in Rangareddy district in Telangana had tried to halt the shooting of Lingaa, stating that some chemicals were mixed in the nearby lake during shoots, polluting local water. But the crew members stated that they had sought the permission of the irrigation department and the village Panchayat for shooting. The crew members also dismissed allegations of chemicals in the lake. During the shooting of the climax portions near the Linganamakki Dam, environmental organisations opposed the permission granted to the production unit for shooting, suggesting a threat to the location as public entry to the dam was prohibited. The organisations also had sent a petition to both the Deputy Collector's office and the Deputy Commissioner's office, who in turn, sent the petition to the Chief Minister of Karnataka, Siddaramaiah, for scrutinity. Regarding the same issue, officials of the Karnataka State Police Board also sent a letter to the Chief Minister asking him to end the shooting of the portions of the film there, citing that the bio-diversity and life in and around the dam would be affected. The elephants featured in the film were constructed through CGI, and a disclaimer was issued for this at the beginning of the film.

== Music ==
The soundtrack album consisting of five songs, were composed by A. R. Rahman. The album of the original version was released on 5 November 2014, at a promotional event held at Chennai, with Rajinikanth, K. S. Ravikumar and the cast and crew attending the event, except Rahman where he spoke in a video about the making of the film. The Telugu version was released on 8 November 2014, at a curtain raiser, event held at Hyderabad, where Chiranjeevi and K. Viswanath attended as the chief guest. The Hindi version was released on 26 November 2014.

== Marketing ==
The motion poster of the film was released on Ganesh Chaturthi, on 29 August 2014.The official teaser was released on 22 October 2014, coinciding with Diwali. The trailer was released on 5 November 2014 at the audio launch of the film.

While the original duration of the film lasts about 175 minutes, the makers trimmed the original version from 166 minutes, and the Hindi version was reduced to 148 minutes, due to mixed reviews. The makers unveiled few deleted scenes from the film post-release.

== Release ==
=== Theatrical ===
Eros International bought the worldwide distribution rights for Lingaa. The film was released worldwide on 12 December 2014, which coincided with Rajinikanth's birthday, and it is the first time in Rajinikanth's career, to have his film released on his birthday. The film was released on an estimated 5500 screens.

=== Home media ===
The satellite rights of the film were purchased by Jaya TV for ₹32 crore (US$3.3 million).

== Reception ==
=== Box office ===
Lingaa earned ₹22 crore (US$2.3 million) in India and grossed ₹37 crore (US$3.8 million) worldwide on the opening day. It earned ₹51.5 crore (US$5.3 million) nett in India and grossed ₹89 crore (US$9.2 million) worldwide in 3 days.

=== Critical response ===
Lingaa received mixed reviews. M Suganth of The Times of India gave 2.5 out of 5 and wrote, "The scale of the production, some of Santhanam's one-liners and the charisma of Rajinikanth somewhat make it bearable but they aren't enough." Raja Sen of Rediff.com rated 3 out of 5 and felt that "Lingaa is buffoonery at its most old-school". Sify called Lingaa "a mixed bag. The star charisma of Rajinikanth is intact but the film is long with a weak storyline that flounders with a long drawn out climax." Gautaman Bhaskaran of Hindustan Times said "Lingaa offers nothing new despite being one of Rajinikanth's better works in the recent past." Prajakta Hebbar of IBNLive also rated it 3 out of 5, commenting "Because two Rajinikanths are always better than one".

== Controversies ==
=== Script infringement issue ===
On 2 November 2014, the Madurai Bench of Madras High Court bench's Justice M. Venugopal ordered a notice to Rockline Venkatesh, Pon Kumaran and K. S. Ravikumar on account of accusations by the filmmaker K. R. Ravi Rathinam of the Tamil Nadu Housing Board colony who claimed that script of Lingaa was actually the one he had written for directing a film titled Mullai Vanam 999 based on the construction of the Mullaperiyar dam by John Pennycuick. Further, Rajinikanth who was not involved in the film script larceny was issued notice as he had distribution rights for the film. However, Justice M. Venugopal refused to pass any interim orders to hold audio release that is scheduled on 5 November 2014. On 3 December 2014, the court dismissed a writ petition filed by Ravi Rathinam. Justice Venugopal claimed the dispute to be private and it could have been solved only by initiating civil or criminal proceedings and not by invoking the writ jurisdiction of the High Court.

=== Distributors' losses ===
The film's worldwide distribution rights were sold for ₹135 crore (US$14 million). The distributors of Tamil Nadu suffered large losses and asked for their money back. A distributor under the banner Marina stated that it suffered losses in Trichy and Thanjavur areas and submitted a petition to go on a hunger strike. Vijayabhargavi Entertainers stated that they suffered losses in Chengalpet region. Capricorn Pictures incurred losses in North Arcot and South Arcot (Cuddalore-Villupuram) circles. Sukra Films and Chandrakala Movies lost money in Coimbatore and Tirunelveli-Tuticorin respectively. The distributors claimed that after 25 days of its release, Lingaa recovered only 30 percent of the down payment. Some theatre owners received settlements for their losses. Rajinikanth later refunded one-third of the ₹33 crore (US$3.4 million) loss reportedly incurred by distributors and exhibitors. He decided to pay them ₹10 crore (US$1.0 million) 'on a humanitarian basis', who demanded a full refund and had threatened a 'begging protest' in front of the actor's residence.
