= Kargal, Karnataka =

Kargal
- Town
- Jog-Kargal
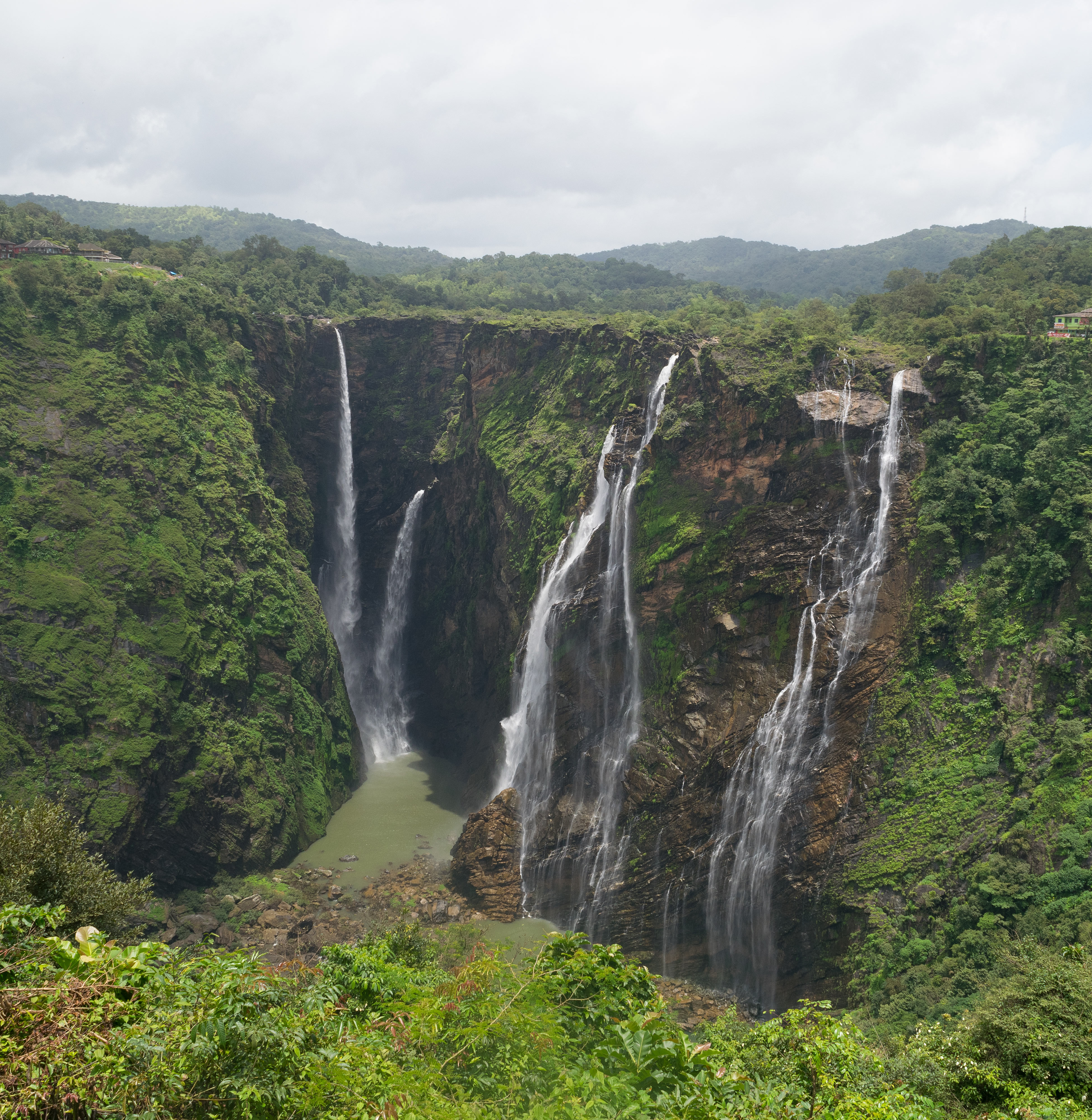
- Panoramic view of Jog Falls from the outskirts of Kargal

- Location in Karnataka, India
- Coordinates: 14°11′23″N 74°48′50″E
- Country: India
- State: Karnataka
- District: Shimoga

Population
  - Total: 10,847

Languages
  - Official: Kannada
- Time zone: UTC+5:30 (IST)
- PIN: 577421
- Website: www.jogkargaltown.mrc.gov.in/en

Kargal also known as Jog-Kargal is a town in the Indian state of Karnataka, It is known for its proximity to Jog Falls which is situated on the outskirts of the town, The town is located on the banks of River Sharavati and gained importance after the construction of Linganamakki Dam in the year 1954. Kargal was first constituted as notified area and later upgraded as Kargal Town Panchayat on 2001. Kargal have a population of 10,847 people.

== Demographics ==
Kargal Town Panchayat has population of 10,847 of which 5,374 are males while 5,473 are females as per report released by Census India 2011. The population of children aged 0–6 is 1068 which is 9.85% of total population of Jog Kargal (TP). In Jog Kargal Town Panchayat, the female sex ratio is 1018 against state average of 973. Moreover, the child sex ratio in Jog Kargal is around 942 compared to Karnataka state average of 948. The literacy rate of Jog Kargal city is 86.15% higher than the state average of 75.36%. In Jog Kargal, male literacy is around 91.38% while the female literacy rate is 81.07%.
