= List of film studios in Hyderabad =

The following is the list of film studios located in Hyderabad, India.

Studio	Established Year	Location	Ref.
Sarathi Studios	1956	Ameerpet	
Annapurna Studios	1976	Jubilee Hills	
Ramakrishna Studios	1976	Nacharam	
Padmalaya Studios	1984	Jubilee Hills	
Ramanaidu Studios	1989	Nanakramguda	
Ramoji Film City	1996	Anajpur	
Allu Studios	2022	Gandipet	
