= Ambuthirtha =

Mountain in India

Ambutheertha
- Ambutheertha near Teerthalli
- Location within Karnataka

Highest point
- Coordinates: 13°47′32″N 75°10′36″E

Geography
- Location: Karnataka, India

Ambuthirtha is a culturally significant mountain located approximately 15 km (9 miles) from the village of Thirthahalli, in the Shimoga District of Karnataka, India. It is the source of the Sharavathi river.

== Etymology and legend ==
The name "Ambuthirtha" is derived from Hindu mythology, referring to Rama's bow, also called Ambu. The mountain is also the site of Rama temple. According to legend, Rama shot an arrow into the ground because his wife, Sita, was thirsty. When his arrow hit the ground, water poured out and quenched her thirst. Because the river originated with this event, the river is called "Sharavathi" as Shara translates to an arrow. A Shivalinga marks the origin of the river at Ambuthirtha.

== Hydroelectric power plants ==
The river has two hydroelectric plants built on it that supply electricity to much of Karnataka. The first plant, located upstream, is known as the Mahatma Gandhi Hydroelectric Power Station. The second plant, closer to the bottom of the mountain, is the Shavarathi Valley Project. The nearest city is called Hosanagara (ಹೊಸನಗರ ಶಿವಮೊಗ್ಗ ಕರ್ನಾಟಕ) and is a significant employer in the area. The company that runs the plants is "Ambuthirtha Power Private Limited," headquartered in Bengaluru.

== Habitation ==
There is a temple to Rama on this mountain, accompanied by a small pond. The water level remains constant all year round due to the Sharavathi River; small creeks feed into the pond and help maintain the pond's equilibrium. Donations from the local population finance the temple's upkeep, as it's understood in the region to be a sacred site.
