= Sharavati =

River in India

Sharavati Sharavati River
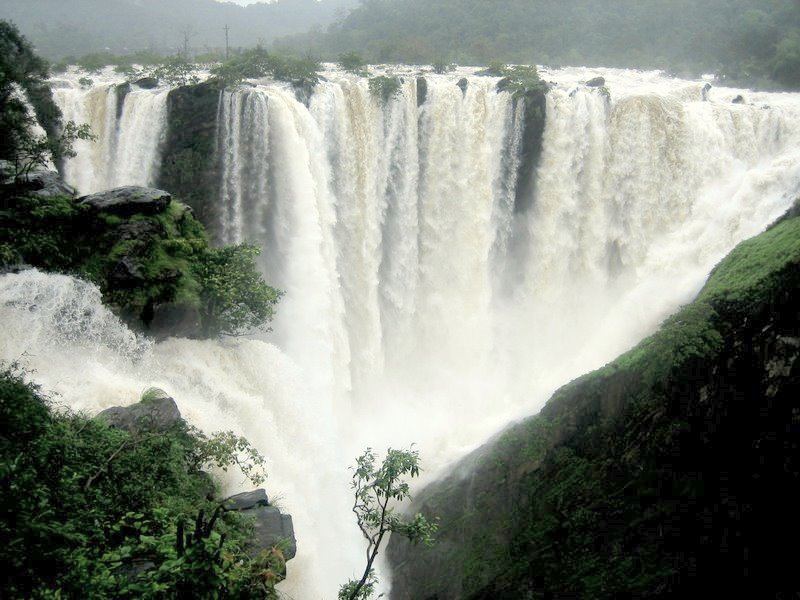
- Jog Falls formed by the Sharavati river.

Location
- Country: India
- State: Karnataka
- Cities: Sagar, Honnavar, Hosanagara

Physical characteristics
- Source: Ambutheertha
  - location: Thirthahalli Taluk, Shimoga, Karnataka
  - coordinates: 13°47′33″N 75°10′35″E
  - elevation: 730 m (2,400 ft)
- Mouth: Laccadive Sea
  - location: Honnavar, Uttara Kannada, Karnataka
  - coordinates: 14°17′57″N 74°25′25″E
  - elevation: 0 ft (0 m)
- Length: 128 km (80 mi)
- Basin size: 2,985 km^{2} (1,153 sq mi)
- Discharge
  - location: Honnavar

Sharāvati is a river which originates and flows entirely within the state of Karnataka in India. It is one of the few westward flowing rivers of India and a major part of the river basin lies in the Western Ghats. The famous Jog Falls, located in Sagar taluk, Shimoga district is formed by this river. The river itself and the regions around it are rich in biodiversity and are home to many rare species of flora and fauna.

== Origin and topography ==
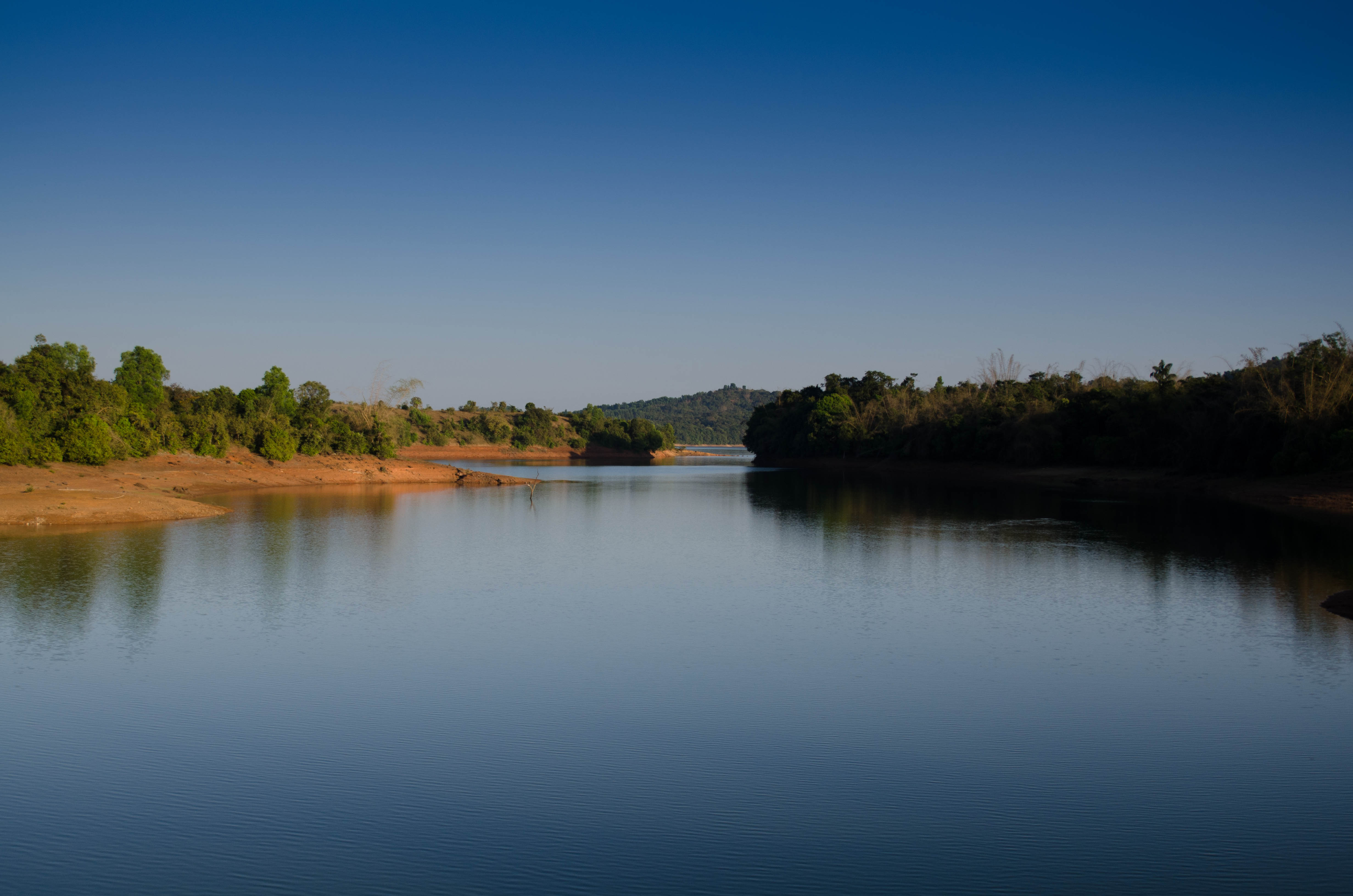
Sharavati River

The river Sharavati originates at a place called Ambutheertha in the Thirthahalli taluk. According to ancient legend, Rama, one of the major deities in Hinduism, shot at the ground with his Ambu (translates to bow and arrow) because his wife, Sita, was thirsty. When his arrow hit the ground, water poured out (translates to Thirtha) and quenched her thirst. Because the river, according to the legend, originated with this event, the river is called "Sharavati" as "Shara" translates to arrow.

The total length of the river is around 128 km (80 mi) and it joins the Arabian Sea at Honnavar in Uttara Kannada district. On its way, the Sharavati forms the Jog Falls where the river falls from a height of 253 m. The river is dammed at Linganamakki. The major tributaries of the river are Nandihole, Haridravathi, Mavinahole, Hilkunji, Yennehole, Hurlihole, and Nagodihole. Sharavati river basin falls into two districts of Karnataka namely Uttara Kannada and Shimoga. The upstream river basin is extended to two taluks i.e., Hosanagar and Sagar. The entire basin has an area of 2,985.66 km^{2} (1,153 sq mi) with upstream being 1,988.99 km^{2} (768 sq mi) and the downstream being 996.67 km^{2} (385 sq mi).

== Geology ==
The river basin mainly consists of Pre-Cambrian rocks. The two major groups of rocks found in the Sharavati river basin are the Dharwar Craton system and the peninsular gneiss.

- The Dharwar Craton system: This system contains metamorphic rocks that are considered to be among the oldest in India. These rocks are derived from ancient sediments like conglomerates, ferruginous quartzites, greywackes, schists and limestones. They are rich in iron and manganese.
- Peninsular gneiss: These are crystalline rocks and are made up of granite, granodiorite, granito-gneiss, migmatite etc.

Soils in the Sharavati basin are mainly lateritic in origin and tend to be acidic and reddish to brownish in colour. The various type of soil found here are clay loamy, clayey, clayey-skeletal, and loamy. Four soil orders are found in the upstream river basin: ultisols, alfisols, inceptisols and entisols.

== Climate ==
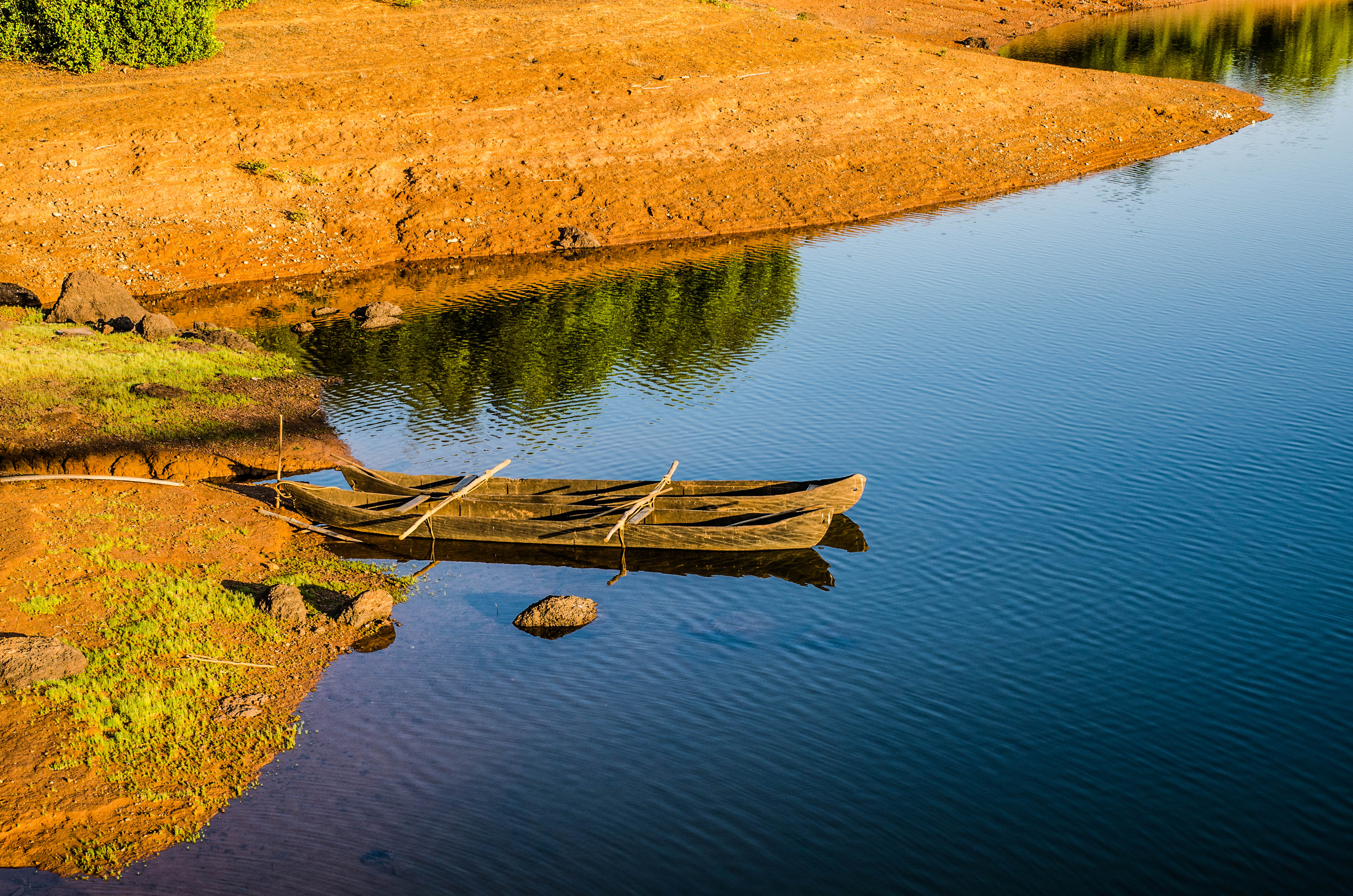
River Sharavati

=== Rainfall ===
With a major part of the river lying in the Sahyadri mountains (Western Ghats), the Sharavati river basin receives a large amount of rainfall. Mean annual rainfall ranges from 6000 mm in the western side to 1700 mm in the eastern side of the basin. About 95% of the rainfall is received during the month of June to September (July being the rainiest) when the southwest monsoon is at its peak. There is some rainfall in the post monsoon season in the form of thundershowers mostly during October and some rainfall also occurs during the summer months of April and May.

=== Temperature ===
April is usually the hottest month with the mean daily maximum temperature at 35.8 °C and the mean daily minimum at 22.2 °C.

=== Humidity ===
During the morning, the relative humidity exceeds 75% for most times of the year. During the months of monsoon, the relative humidity during the afternoons is approximately 60%. During the driest months (January to March), the relative humidity in the afternoon is less than 35%.

== Dams ==
=== Linganamakki dam ===
The Linganamakki dam located in the Sagar taluk has a length of 2.4 km (1 mi) and was constructed across the Sharavati river in 1964. It was designed to impound 4368 million cubic meter of water in an area of around 300 km^{2} (116 sq mi), submerging 50.62 km^{2} (20 sq mi) of wetland and 7 km^{2} (3 sq mi) of dry land, the remaining being forest land and wasteland. The dam's height is 1,819 feet (554 m) above sea level. The total capacity of the reservoir is 152 TMC (Thousand Million Cubicfeet). It has a catchment area of nearly 1,991.71 km^{2} (769 sq mi). It receives water mainly from rainfall and also from the Chakra and Savahaklu reservoirs, which are linked through Linganamakki through a canal. The water from Linganamakki dam flows to Talakalale Balancing Reservoir through a trapezoidal canal with a discharge capacity of 175.56 cubic metres per second. The length of this channel is about 4318.40 m with a submersion of 7.77 km^{2} (3 sq mi). It has a catchment area of about 46.60 km^{2} (18 sq mi). The gross capacity of the reservoir is 129.60 cu meters.

=== Gerusoppa dam ===
The Gerusoppa dam project was completed in 2002 with the main purpose of generation of electricity. It was constructed near the Gerusoppa village in the Uttara Kannada district. It has a height of 56 metres and a length of 545 metres.

The Power House on the right bank of the Gerusoppa dam consists of four Francis-type turbines coupled to the generating units of 60 MW each. The units are configured to operate at a design head of 47.5 m. An outdoor switchyard is located between the toe of the dam and the power house. Power from the outdoor yard is evacuated through a 220 kV double circuit transmission line connected to the state grid at Talaguppa.

The Gerusoppa Project is a KPC project and the Civil Chief Engineer at the time of completion of the project was K L Krishnamurthy. This is one of the projects constructed by R. N. Shetty under the name Naveen Mechanised Construction Company Private Limited. The Present Chief Engineer (Electrical) is Shivaji . The main power house was constructed by Mr.Chinna Nachimuthu.

== Waterfalls ==
=== Jog Falls ===
Jog Falls or Gerusoppa is the highest waterfall in India if the single drop water fall and the volume of water are considered for height. Otherwise, it is the third highest waterfall in India (after Kunchikal Falls and Barkana Falls); all three are located in Shivamogga district. The Sharavati river plunges 253 meters (830 ft) into a deep gorge here in four different segments called as Raja, Roarer, Rocket and Rani. The volume of water that reaches Jog Falls is controlled upstream by the Linganamakki dam, and the falls are at their mightiest when water is released from the dam.

== Flora and fauna ==
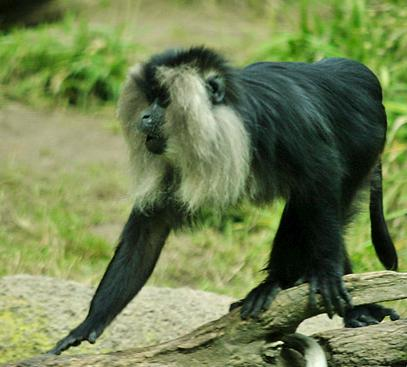
The endangered lion-tailed macaque found in the Sharavati Valley wildlife sanctuary

The Sharavati river basin is rich in biodiversity. In a survey conducted in the basin, 23 amphibians belonging to the families of Bufonidae, Ichthyophiidae, Microhylidae, Ranidae and Rhacophoridae were recorded. Of these, 15 species are endemic to the Western Ghats. The river lends its name to the following species of fish that have been discovered in its waters:

- Batasio sharavatiensis: A bagrid catfish discovered near Jog Falls, Uttara Kannada district.
- Schistura sharavatiensis: A fish species discovered in Sharavati river near Algod, Shimoga district.

In 2011, two new species of diatoms were discovered from Hirebhaskeri Dam of Sharavati River.

=== Sharavati Valley Wildlife Sanctuary ===
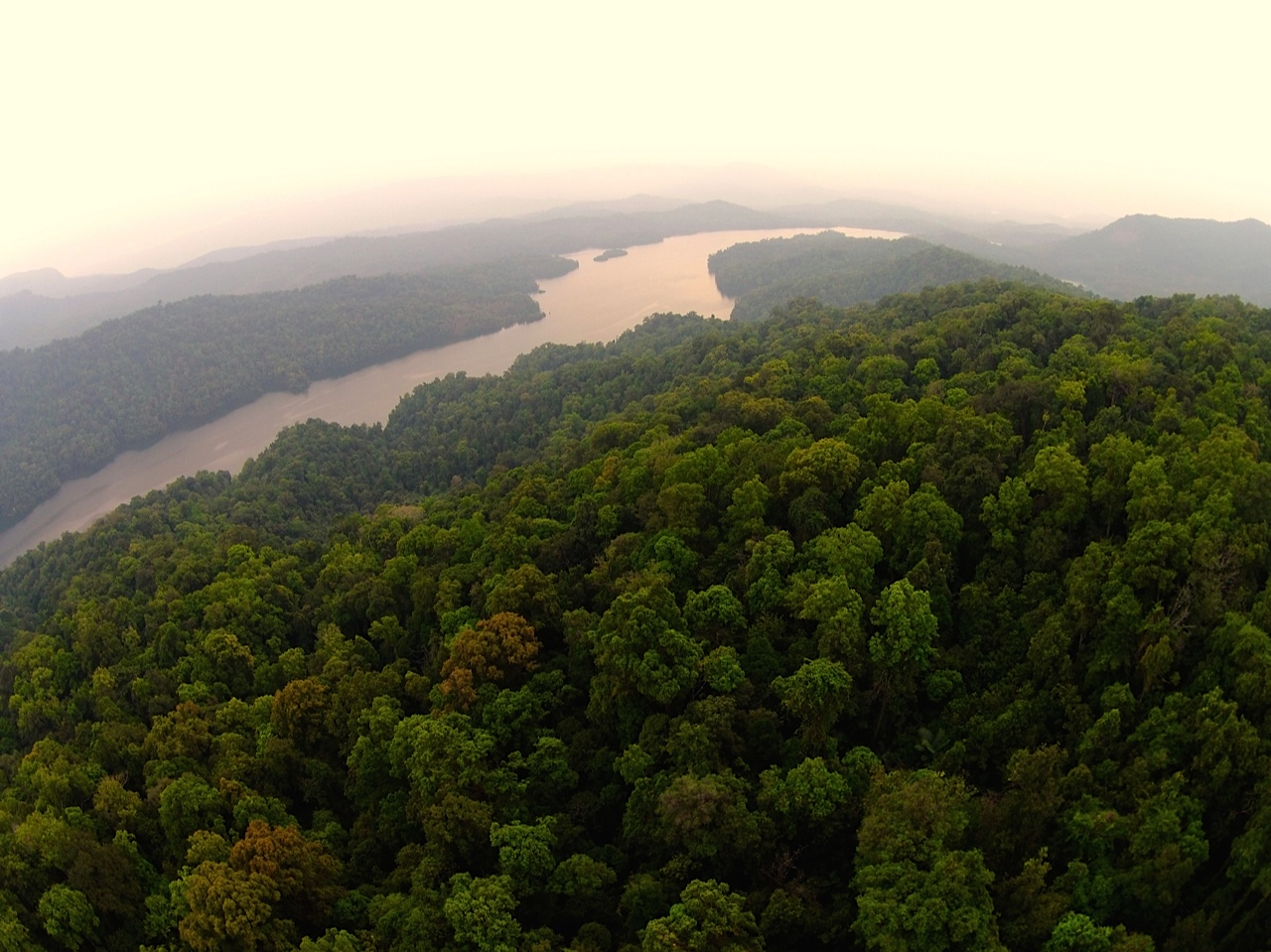
View of Sharavati Valley

A part of the Sharavati river basin was declared as a wildlife sanctuary on 20 April 1972. Spread over an area of 431.23 km^{2} (166 sq mi), it has dense evergreen and semi-evergreen forests. Linganamakki reservoir, with an area of 128.7 km^{2} (50 sq mi), is a part of this sanctuary. The remaining area has been divided into core zone (74.33 km^{2}.), buffer zone (170.67 km^{2}) and tourism zone (57.53 km^{2}). The altitude in the sanctuary varies from 94 m to 1102 m, the highest point being Devarakonda on the southern edge of the sanctuary. Temperatures range from 15° to 38 °C and the mean annual rainfall is 4500 mm.

Flora

The sanctuary has mainly evergreen, semi-green and some moist deciduous forests. Trees in the evergreen forest include species such as Dipterocarpus indicus, Calophyllum tomentosum, Machilus macrantha, Caryota urens and Aporosa lindleyana. In the semi-evergreen and moist deciduous forests, common species include Lagerstroemia lanceolata, Hopea parviflora, Dalbergia latifolia, Dillenia pentagyna, Careya arborea, Emblica officinalis, Randia sp., Terminalia sp. and Vitex altissima.

Fauna

The sanctuary is a refuge of the endangered lion-tailed macaque. Other mammals include tiger, leopard (black panther), wild dog, jackal, sloth bear, spotted deer, sambar, barking deer, mouse deer, wild boar, common langur, bonnet macaque, Malabar giant squirrel, giant flying squirrel, porcupine, otter and pangolin. Reptiles include king cobra, python, rat snake, crocodile and monitor lizard. Some of the avian species found in the sanctuary include three species of hornbill, paradise flycatcher, racket-tailed drongo and Indian lories and lorikeets.

== Places of interest ==
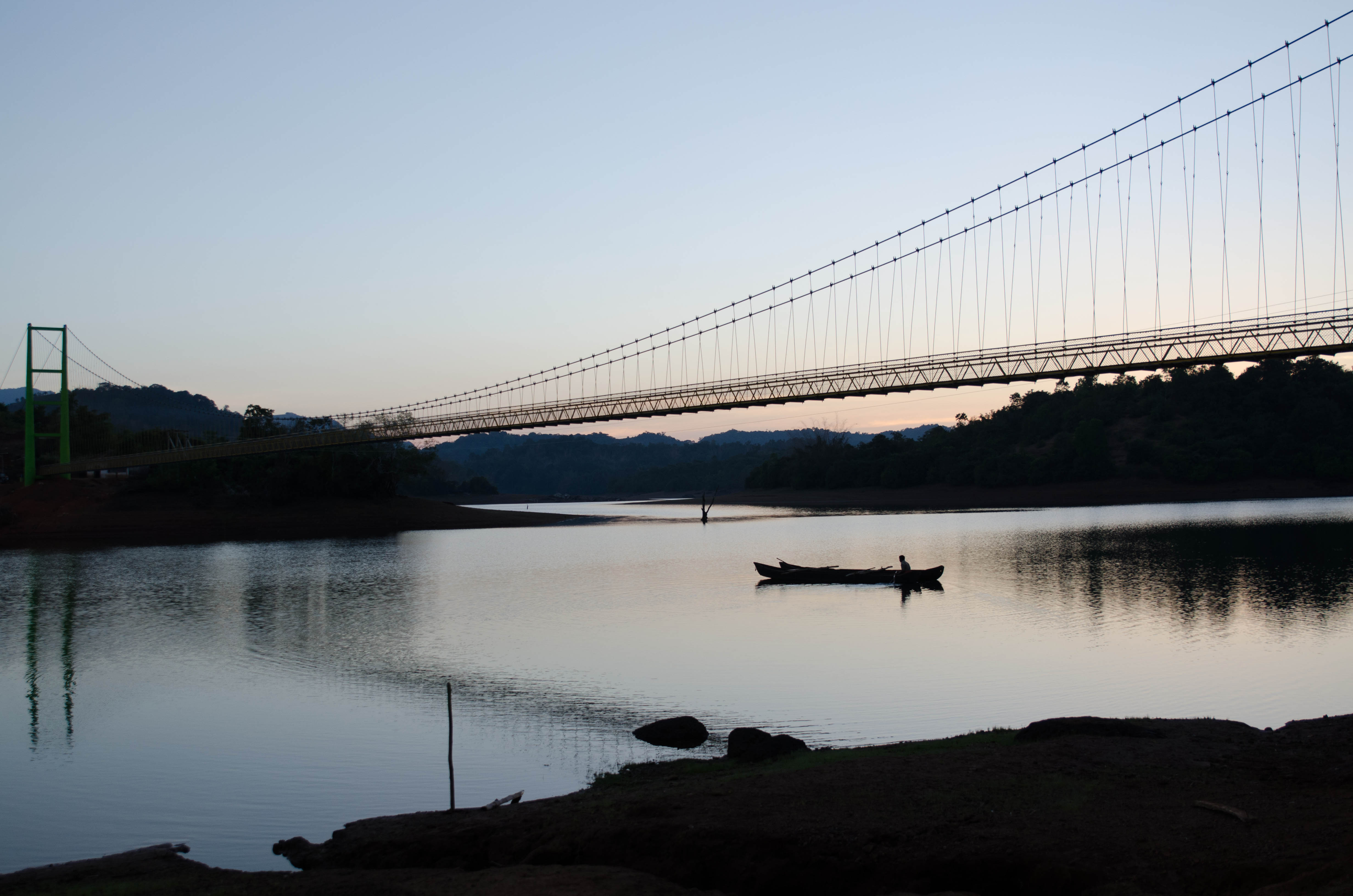
A bridge over river Sharavati

=== Honnemaradu ===
Honnemaradu is an island on the reservoir formed by the Linganamakki dam. It is located in the Sagar taluk of Shimoga district. This place is popular for water sports, such as canoeing, kayaking and wind surfing. Bird-watching enthusiasts also visit this place.
