= Jog Falls =

Waterfall in Karnataka, India

- Joga Jalapata
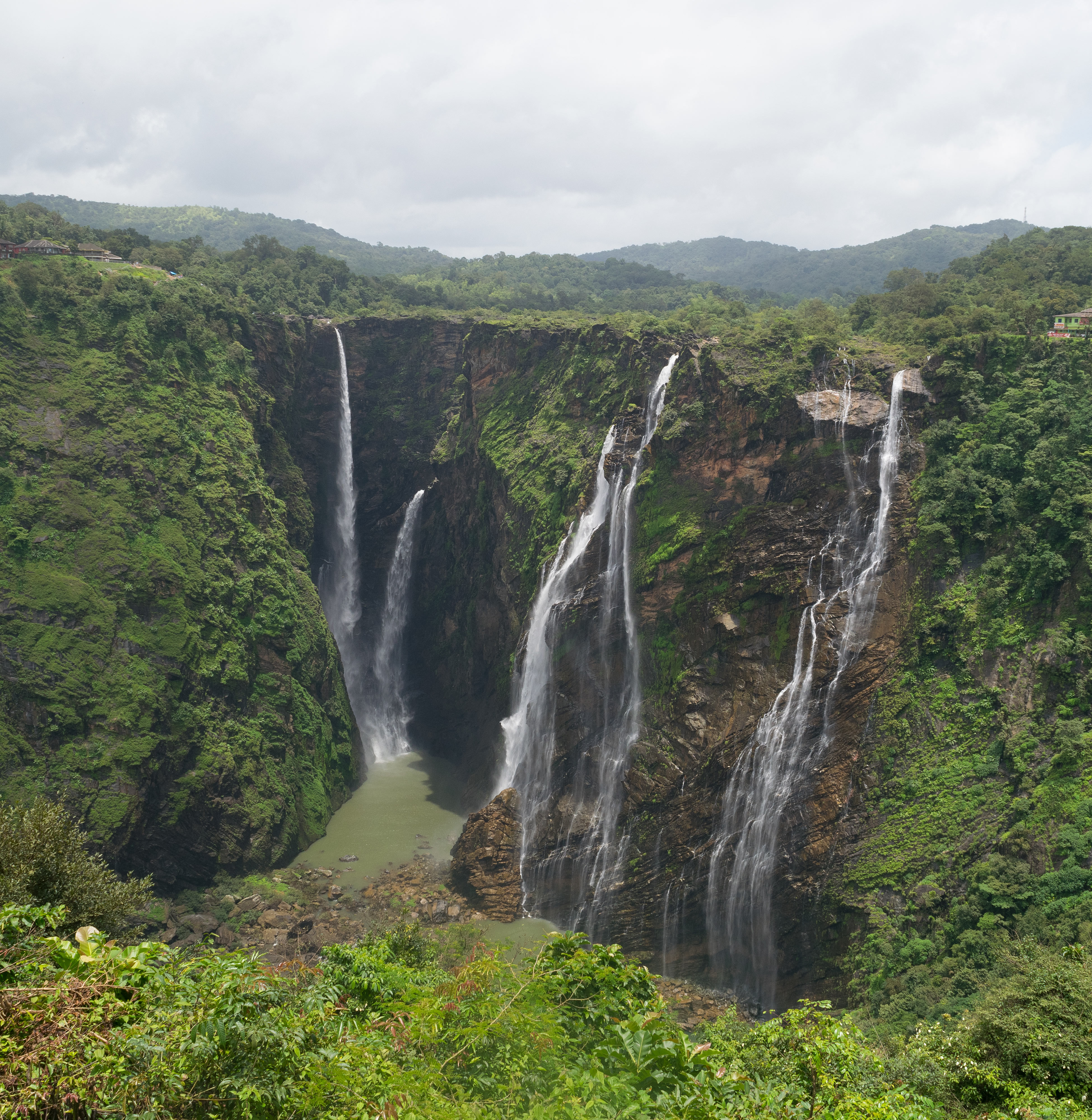
- From the southwest (most famous viewpoint)
- Interactive map of Jog Falls
- Location: Jog Falls, Sagara taluk, Shivamogga district, Karnataka
- Type: Cataract, Segmented
- Elevation: 488 m (1,601 ft)
- Total height: 253 m (830 ft)
- Number of drops: 4 (Raja (king), Rani (queen), Roarer, Rocket)
- Longest drop: 254 m (833 ft)
- Average width: 472 m (1,549 ft)
- Watercourse: Sharavati River
- Average flow rate: 153 m^{3}/s (5,400 cu ft/s)

Jog Falls (Kannada: [dʒoːɡɐ], also known as Gerusoppa Falls, Joga Jalapata, or Jogada Gundi) is a series of large, segmented waterfalls on the Sharavati River in Karnataka state of India, created by the river plunging approximately 253 metres (830 ft) and splitting into four distinct cascades (Raja, Rani, Roarer, and Rocket). The waterfalls are situated in the Sagar taluk of the Shivamogga district.

Jog Falls is a major attraction for tourists. It features two primary viewpoints: the first one is the front panoramic viewpoint located in the Jog-Kargal Town of Sagara taluk in the Shivamogga district and the second is the British Bungalow viewpoint, located adjacent to the falls in the Siddapur taluk of Uttara Kannada. It is a segmented waterfall which, depending on rainfall and season, may become a plunge waterfall. It is the third-highest waterfall in India by total height, and is ranked 36th in the list of the world's highest free-falling waterfalls, 490th in the world by total height, and 128th in the list of single-drop waterfalls according to the World Waterfall Database.

== Description ==
Jog Falls is created by the Sharavati River dropping a total of 253 m (830 ft), making it the third-highest waterfall in India after the Nohkalikai Falls with a drop of 335 m (1,099 ft) in Meghalaya and the Dudhsagar Falls with a drop of 310 m (1,020 ft) in Goa.

Sharavathi, a river which rises at Ambutirtha, near Nonabur in the Thirthahalli taluk, Shimoga district, takes a northwesterly course by Fatte petta, receives the Haridravati on the right below Pattaguppe and the Yenne Hole on the left above Barangi. Then, it bends to the west, precipitates itself down the Jog Falls (a.k.a. Gersoppa Falls), and passes the village of Gerusoppa (properly Geru-Sappe), which is some 30 kilometres (19 mi) away, discharging into the Arabian Sea at Honnavar in Uttara Kannada district.

The Sharavathi, flowing over a very rocky bed about 250 yards (230 m) wide, reaches a tremendous chasm, 290 m (950 ft) deep, and the water comes down in four distinct falls named Raja, Rani, Roarer, and Rocket. The Raja Fall comes down in a single unbroken column with a height of 250 m (830 ft). Halfway down, it is encountered by the Roarer, which precipitates itself into a vast cup and then rushes violently downwards to meet the Raja. The Rocket shoots downwards in a series of jets. The Rani moves more quietly over the mountainside in a sheet of foam. The Karnataka State Tourism Development Corporation has built steps from the viewpoint at the top, where the waterfall can be seen from across, to the bottom of the hill. There are approximately 1,400 steps to reach the bottom of the hill.

== Significance ==
Associated with the waterfall is the nearby Linganamakki Dam across the Sharavati River. The water released from the dam adds to the beauty of the waterfalls in the monsoon season. The power station has been operational since 1948 and is of 120 MW capacity, one of the largest hydroelectric stations in India at the time of its construction though a relatively small source of electric power for Karnataka today. The power station was previously named Krishna Rajendra hydroelectric project, after the King of Mysore at that time. The name was later changed to Mahatma Gandhi Hydroelectric Project. It was served by the Hirebhaskara Dam until 1960. After 1960, due to the ideas of Mokshagundam Visvesvarayya, Linganamakki Dam has been used for power generation.

== Power ==
The hydroelectric project was conceived by the government of Mysore in mid-1943. A scheme to generate 64,000 horsepower at a cost of ₹358 lakh was planned. The Power House on the right bank of the Gerusoppa Dam consists of four Francis-type turbines coupled to two generating units of 60 MW each. The units are configured to operate at a design head of 47.5 meters. An outdoor switchyard is located between the toe of the dam and the power house. Power from the outdoor yard is evacuated through a 220 KV double-circuit transmission line connected to the state grid at Talaguppa. The dam's power capacity was later increased and currently generates 240 MW of power.

== Transport connectivity ==
Jog Falls is situated near Sagara city.

- Nearest railway stations (distance to the location):
  - Talaguppa (13 km [8.1 mi])
  - Sagara (30 km [19 mi])
  - Honnavar(68 km [42 mi]) on the Mangalore - Bombay Konkan Railway route
  - Bhatkal (90 km [56 mi]) also on the Mangalore - Bombay Konkan Railway route
- Nearest bus station:
  - Sagara
  - Jog Falls
- Nearest centre for private road transport is Sagara.
- Nearest airport (aerial distance to the location):
  - Domestic
    - Shivamogga Airport (RQY): 100 km (62 mi)
    - Hubli Airport (HBX): 133 km (83 mi)
  - International
    - Bengaluru International Airport (BLR): 422 km (262 mi)
    - Mangalore International Airport (India) (formerly Bajpe Airport) (IXE): 200 km (120 mi)
    - Goa Airport (GOI): 264 km (164 mi)

== Gallery ==
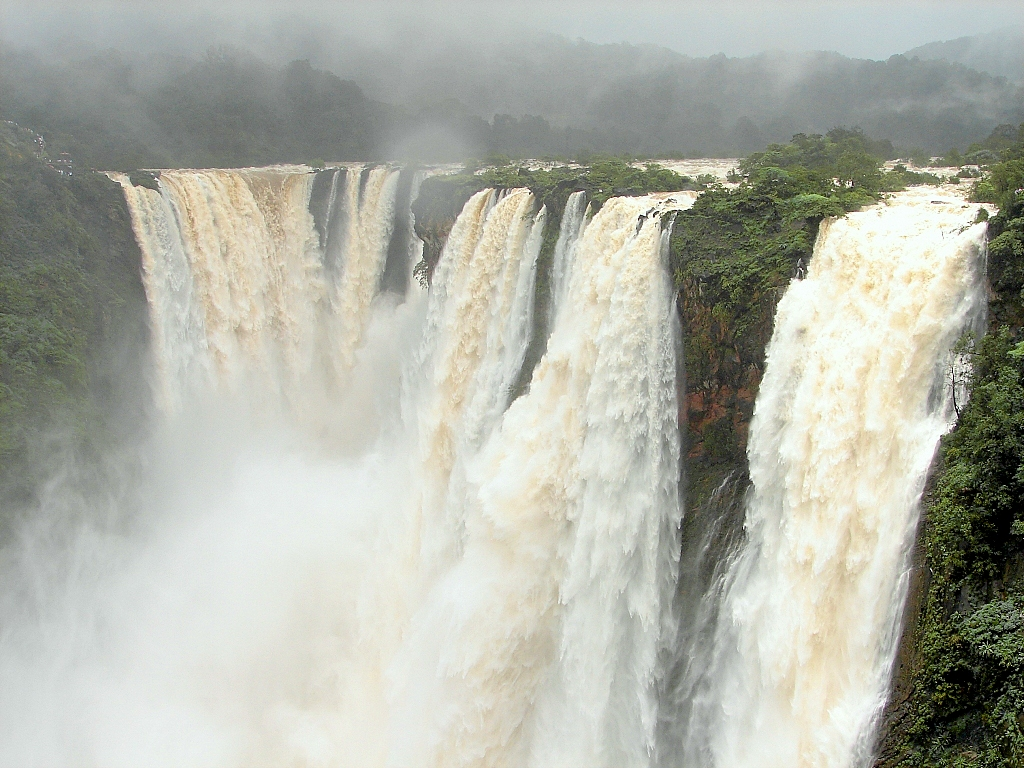
During the monsoon

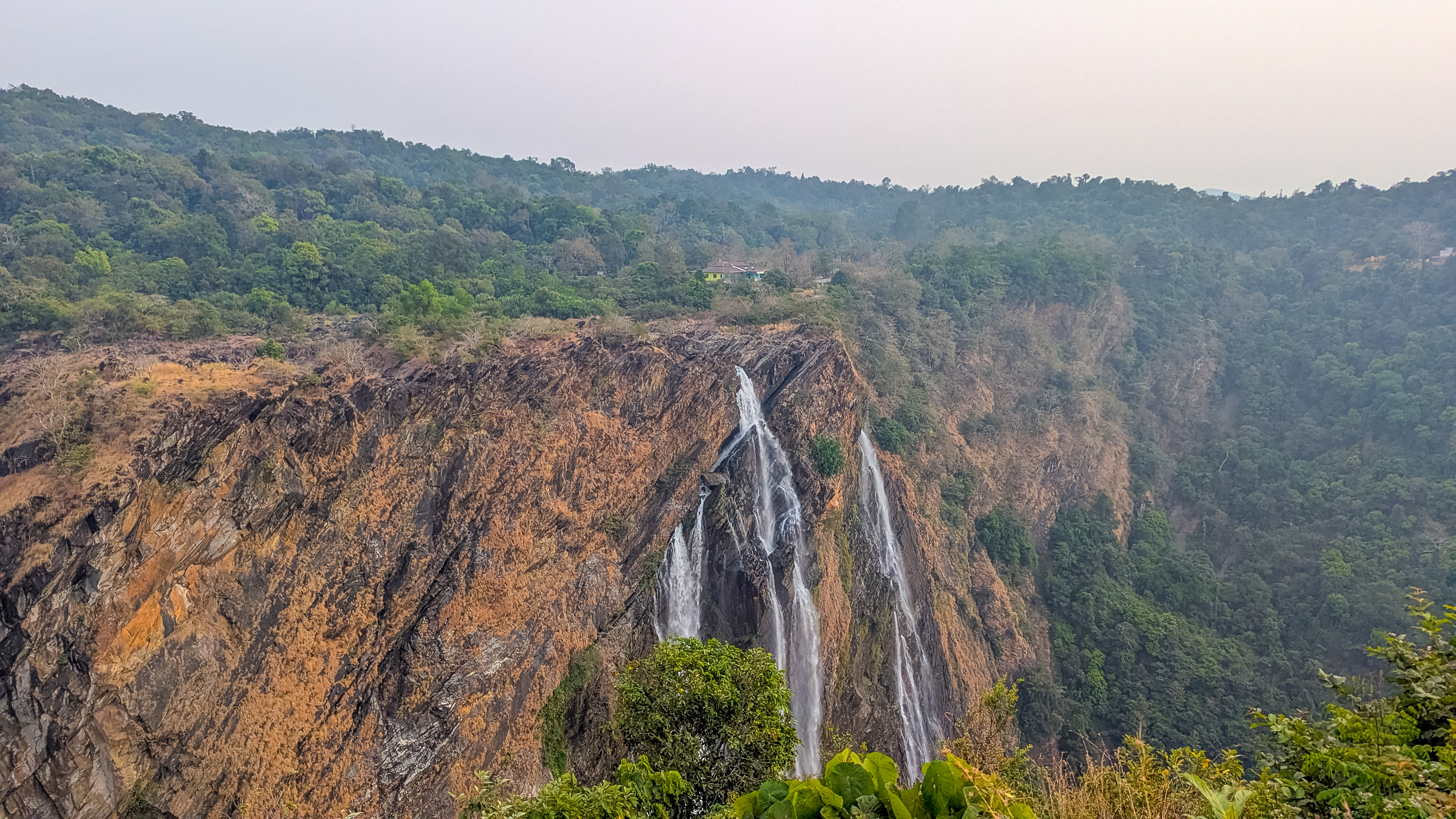
From the northwest

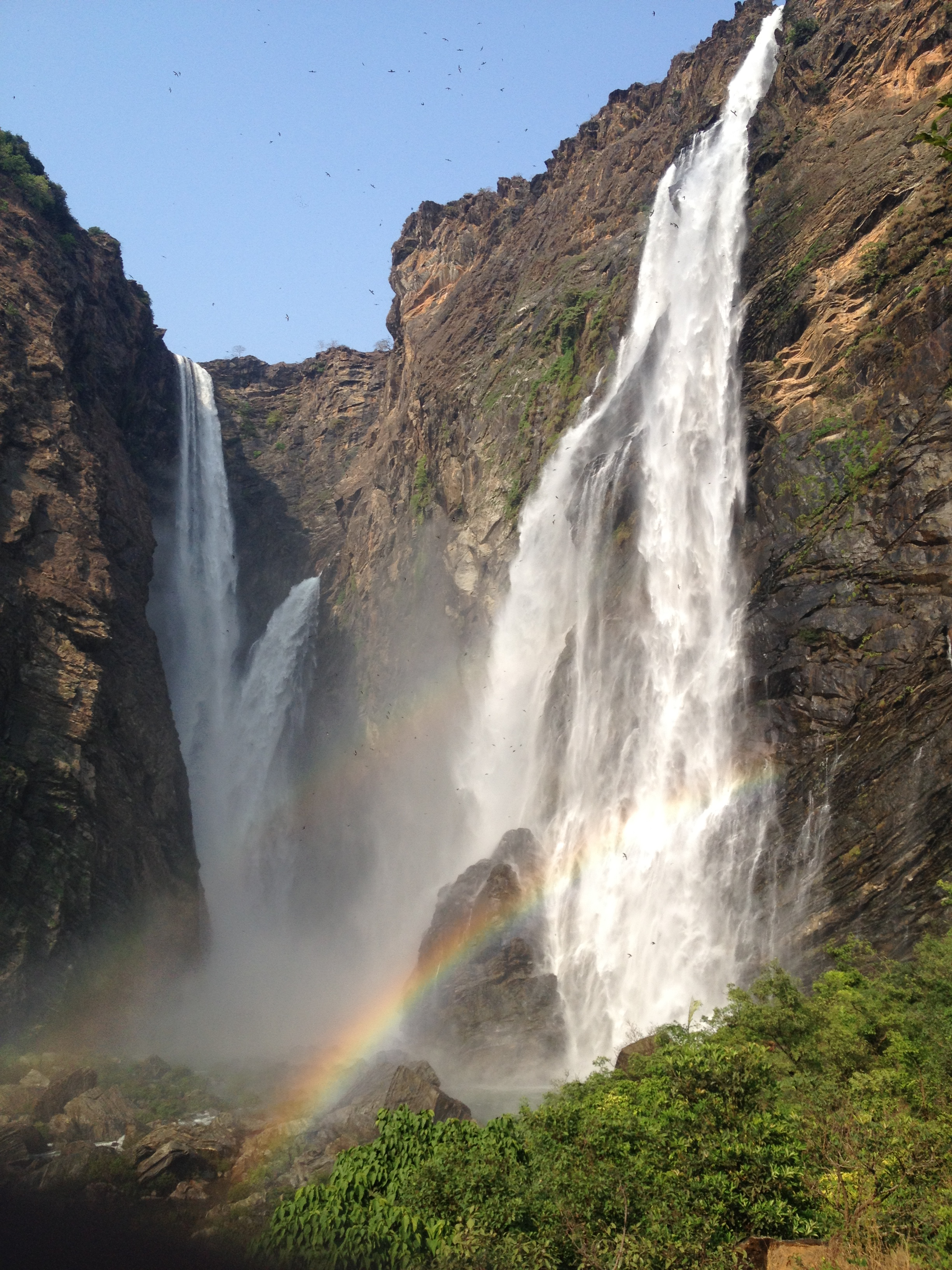
From below

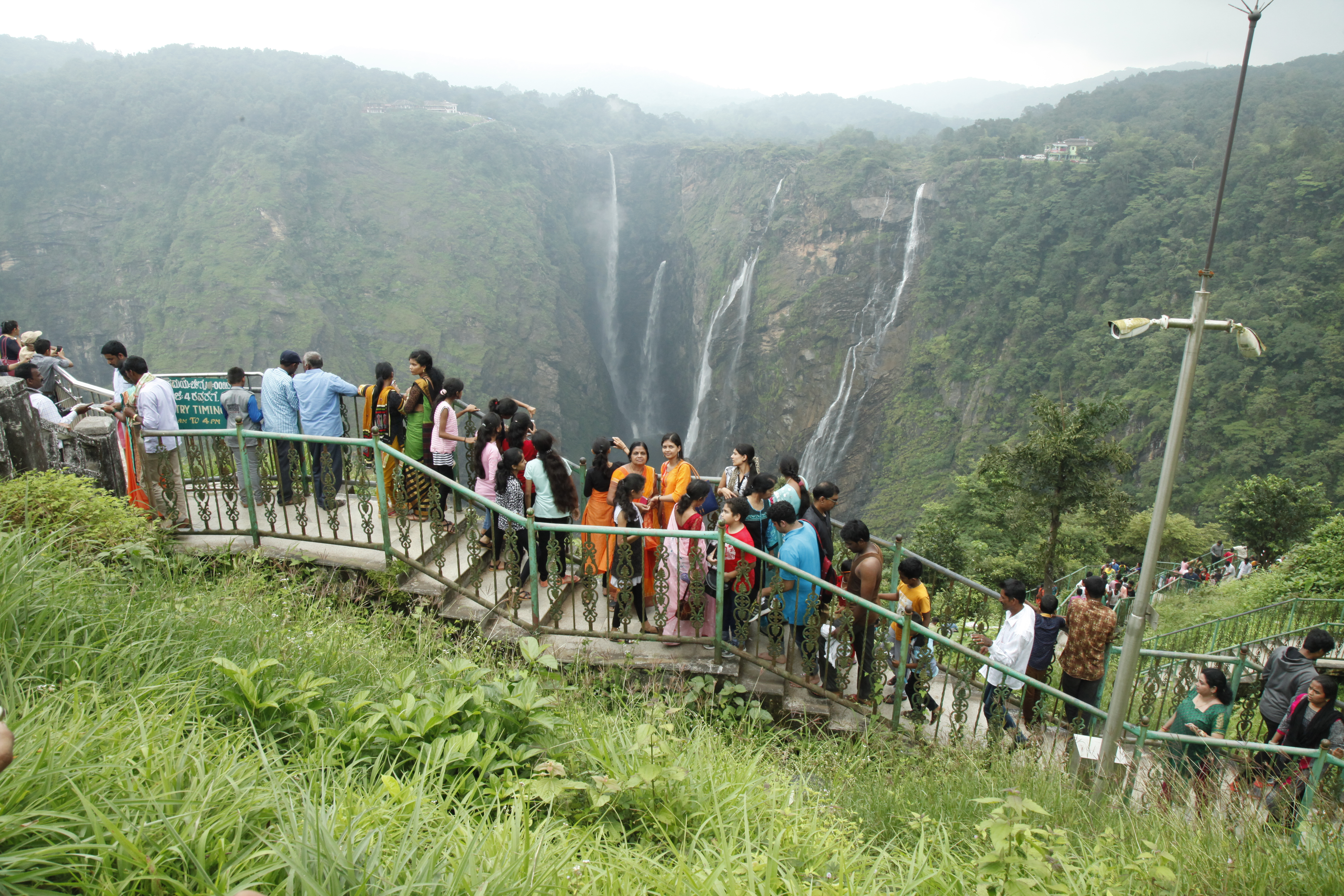
Visitors

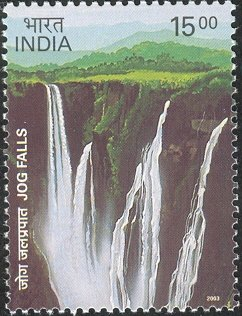
2003 Indian stamp

== See also ==
- List of waterfalls in India
- List of waterfalls
- Kodachadri
- Gudavi Bird Sanctuary
