= Linganamakki Dam =

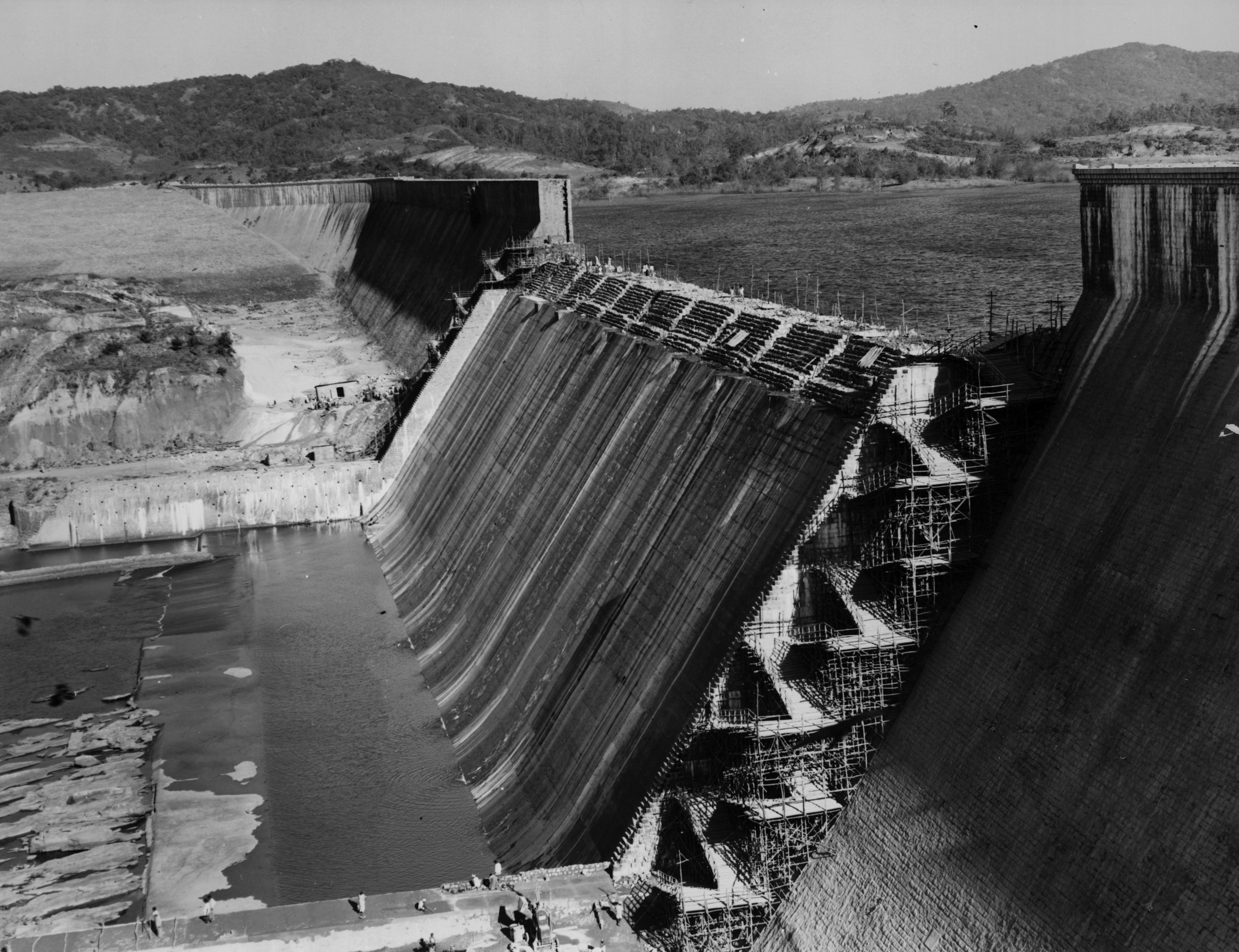
- Interactive map of Linganamakki Dam
- Official name: Linganamakki Reservoir
- Location: Linganamakki, Sagara Taluk, Shivamogga district, Karnataka, India
- Coordinates: 14.175587°N 74.84627°E
- Construction began: 1964

Dam and spillways
- Impounds: Sharavathi River
- Height: 193 ft
- Length: 2.74 km

Reservoir
- Creates: Linganamakki Reservoir
- Total capacity: 151.75 Tmcft
- Catchment area: 1991.71 km^{2}

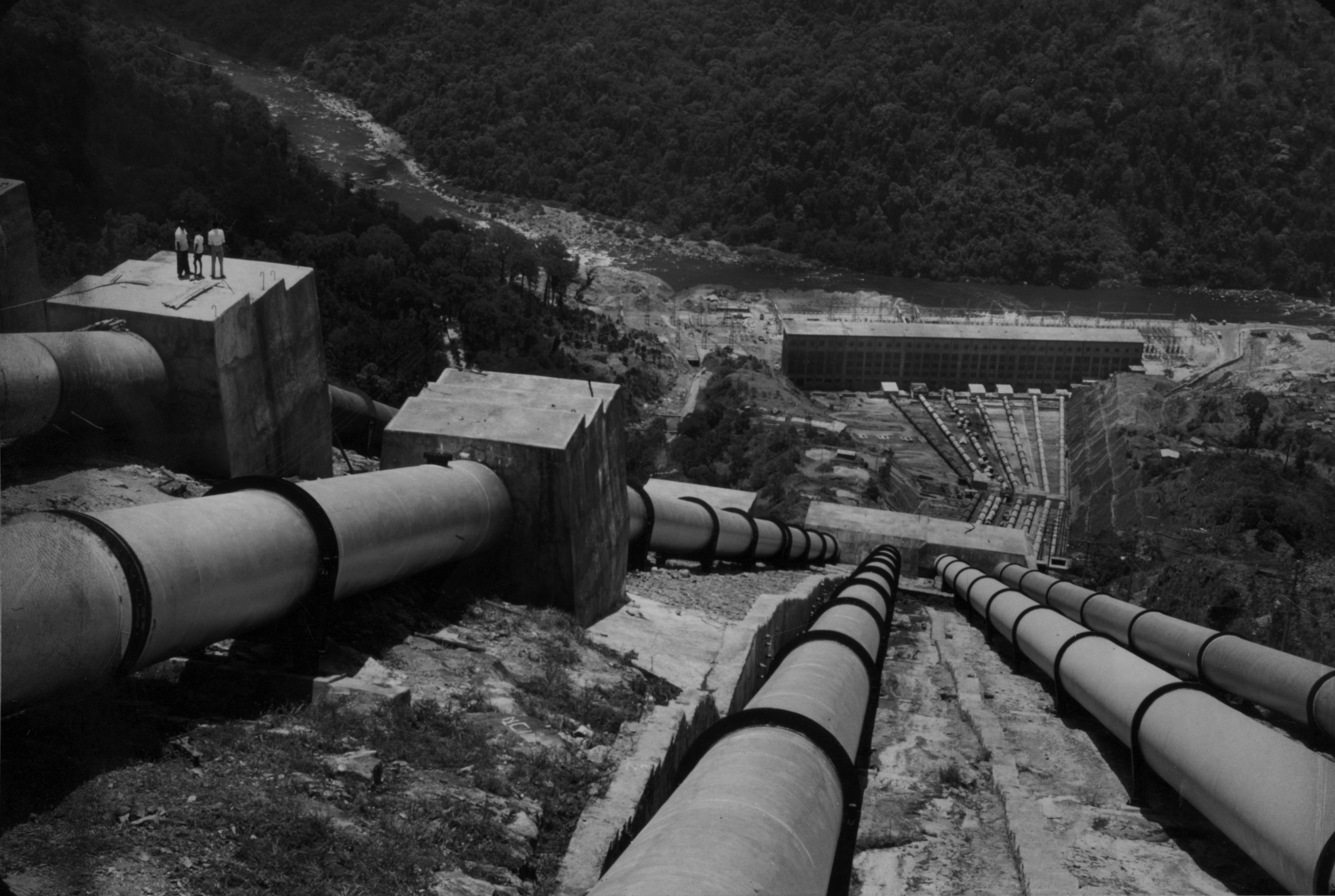
A view of the penstocks leading to the generators of the Linganamakki dam.

The Linganamakki Dam was constructed by the Karnataka State Government in 1964. Located in the Linganamakki village of Sagara taluk, Shimoga district the dam has a length of 2.74 kilometres (1.70 mi) stretching across the Sharavathi river. It is located about 9 km from Jog Falls on the same river. It has an effective storage capacity of 4.29 cubic km or 151.52 tmc ft of water. The dam is used for generation of hydroelectricity in Sharavathi Valley Hydro Electric Project.
