= Anajpur =

- Village
- Location in Telangana, India Anajpur (India)
- Coordinates: 17°16′15.38″N 78°41′35.8″E
- Country: India
- State: Telangana

Languages
  - Official: Telugu
- Time zone: UTC+5:30 (IST)
- Postal code: 501512
- Vehicle registration: TS
- Website: telangana.gov.in

Anajpur is a village in Rangareddy district in Telangana, India. It falls under Hayathnagar mandal and is close to the Outer Ring Road, Hyderabad. Anajpur village is home to Ramoji Film City, the world's largest film production facility.
