= List of highways numbered 142 =

The following highways are numbered 142:

== Cambodia ==
- National Road 142 (Cambodia)

== Canada ==
- Nova Scotia Highway 142
- Prince Edward Island Route 142

== Costa Rica ==
- National Route 142

== Japan ==
- Japan National Route 142
- Fukuoka Prefectural Route 142
- Nara Prefectural Route 142

== Malaysia ==
- Malaysia Federal Route 142

== United Kingdom ==
- A142 road
- B142 road

== United States ==
- Alabama State Route 142
- Arkansas Highway 142
- California State Route 142
- Colorado State Highway 142
- Connecticut Route 142
- Florida State Road 142 (pre-1945) (former)
  - County Road 142 (Jefferson County, Florida)
  - County Road 142 (Leon County, Florida)
- Georgia State Route 142
- Illinois Route 142
  - Illinois Route 142A (former)
- Indiana State Road 142
- Iowa Highway 142 (former)
- Kentucky Route 142
- Louisiana Highway 142
- Maine State Route 142
- Maryland Route 142 (former)
- Massachusetts Route 142
- M-142 (Michigan highway)
- Missouri Route 142
- Nevada State Route 142 (former)
- New Hampshire Route 142
- New Mexico State Road 142
- New York State Route 142
  - County Route 142 (Cayuga County, New York)
  - County Route 142 (Erie County, New York)
  - County Route 142 (Fulton County, New York)
    - County Route 142A (Fulton County, New York)
  - County Route 142 (Montgomery County, New York)
  - County Route 142 (Niagara County, New York)
  - County Route 142 (Rensselaer County, New York)
  - County Route 142 (Sullivan County, New York)
  - County Route 142 (Tompkins County, New York)
- North Carolina Highway 142
- Ohio State Route 142
- Oklahoma State Highway 142
- Pennsylvania Route 142 (former)
- Rhode Island Route 142 (former)
- Tennessee State Route 142
- Texas State Highway 142
  - Texas State Highway Loop 142
  - Farm to Market Road 142
- Utah State Route 142
- Vermont Route 142
- Virginia State Route 142
  - Virginia State Route 142 (1923-1926) (former)
  - Virginia State Route 142 (1932-1933) (former)
- Washington State Route 142
- Wisconsin Highway 142

Territories

- Puerto Rico Highway 142

| Preceded by 141 | Lists of highways 142 | Succeeded by 143 |
