= Vaddi, Karnataka =

Village in Uttara Kannada, Karnataka, India

Coordinates: 14°37′N 74°34′E

Vaddi is a village located in Uttara Kannada district of Ankola Taluk in Karnataka state of India. The road which passes through the village, State Highway 143 SH143 is known as Vaddi Ghat. Vaddi Ghat lies in the heart of the Western Ghats between Sirsi and Ankola. Its average elevation is approximately 508 meters above sea level. The Rock Mountains of Yana are around three kilometers away from Vaddi village.

== Vaddi Ghat Road ==
State Highway 143 is maintained by the Karnataka State Highway Department and connects the coastal town of Gokarna and the hill station Sirsi via the Western Ghats mountain range, passing through the village of Vaddi. SH143 begins in Sirsi and passes through Mathighatta, Devanahalli, Yana, Malbagi, Achave, Kodemane, and Hillur on its way to Ankola.

With a total of 21 hairpin curves, the highway is difficult for cars. Its elevation varies from 80 meters (Western Ghats) to 585 meters (Hill Station Sirsi).

Though SH143 is a state highway and the only road which passes through Vaddi, it is poorly maintained. Heavy motor vehicles may struggle to pass through Vaddi on SH143's single lane. Karnataka State Road Transport Corporation provides only one bus per day via this road. The bus originates from Sirsi and runs to Gokarna.
