= Achave =

- village
- Interactive map of Achave
- Coordinates: 14.6372°N 74.5311°E
- Country: India
- State: Karnataka
- District: Uttara Kannada
- Talukas: Ankola

Government
  - Body: Village Panchayat

Languages
  - Official: Kannada
- Time zone: UTC+5:30 (IST)
- Postal code: 581344
- Nearest city: Uttara Kannada
- Civic agency: Village Panchayat

Achave is a village in the southern state of Karnataka, India. It is located in the Ankola taluk of Uttara Kannada district in Karnataka.

This village is known for its large number of mango, kokum, coconut and arecanut plantations and many micro enterprises. Inhabited communities are Nadavaru, Brahmin, Halakki Vokkaliga, Marathi, Namdhari Naik, Komarpant, Siddhi, Patagar, scheduled castes and scheduled tribes.

Nearby villages include Kuntakani, Angadibail, Mabage, Keshwalli, and Motigudda.

Achave is known for its nature, including Vibhuthi Falls and the Yana rocks.

Achave is a developing village in Ankola.

== See also ==
- Hillur
- Uttara Kannada
- Districts of Karnataka
- Mangalore
