= List of highways numbered 140 =

Route 140 or Highway 140 may refer to:

== Australia ==
- Hamilton Highway

== Canada ==
- New Brunswick Route 140
- Ontario Highway 140
- Prince Edward Island Route 140

== Costa Rica ==
- National Route 140

== Germany ==
- Bundesautobahn 140

== India ==
- National Highway 140 (India)

== Japan ==
- Japan National Route 140
- Fukuoka Prefectural Route 140
- Nara Prefectural Route 140

== Malaysia ==
- Malaysia Federal Route 140

== United Kingdom ==
- A140 road
- B140 road

== United States ==
- Interstate 140 (two current highways)
- U.S. Route 140 (former)
- Alabama State Route 140
  - County Route 140 (Lee County, Alabama)
- Arkansas Highway 140
- California State Route 140
- Colorado State Highway 140
- Connecticut Route 140
- Florida State Road 140 (pre-1945) (former)
  - Florida State Road 140A (pre-1945) (former)
  - County Road 140 (Madison County, Florida)
- Georgia State Route 140
- Illinois Route 140
- Indiana State Road 140
- Iowa Highway 140
- K-140 (Kansas highway)
- Kentucky Route 140
- Louisiana Highway 140
- Maine State Route 140
- Maryland Route 140
- Massachusetts Route 140
- M-140 (Michigan highway)
- Missouri Route 140 (former)
- Nevada State Route 140
- New Hampshire Route 140
- New Jersey Route 140
- New Mexico State Road 140
- New York State Route 140
  - County Route 140 (Broome County, New York)
  - County Route 140 (Erie County, New York)
  - County Route 140 (Fulton County, New York)
  - County Route 140 (Montgomery County, New York)
  - County Route 140 (Niagara County, New York)
  - County Route 140 (Onondaga County, New York)
  - County Route 140 (Rensselaer County, New York)
  - County Route 140 (Wayne County, New York)
- North Carolina Highway 140
- Ohio State Route 140
- Oregon Route 140
- Tennessee State Route 140
- Texas State Highway 140
  - Texas State Highway Loop 140 (former)
  - Texas State Highway Spur 140
  - Farm to Market Road 140
- Utah State Route 140
  - Utah State Route 140 (pre-1969) (former)
- Vermont Route 140
- Virginia State Route 140
  - Virginia State Route 140 (pre-1933) (former)
  - Virginia State Route 140 (1933-1949) (former)
- Washington State Route 140 (former)
- West Virginia Route 140
- Wisconsin Highway 140

Territories

- Puerto Rico Highway 140

Preceded by 139	Lists of highways 140	Succeeded by 141
