= 137th Street =

137th Street may refer to:

- 137th Street, a street in Manhattan, King's County, New York City, New York State, USA
- 137th Street (Metra), another name for Riverdale (Metra station) just south of the city of Chicago
- 137th Street Yard, an underground rail yard on Manhattan, New York County, New York City, New York State, USA
- 137th Street – City College (IRT Broadway – Seventh Avenue Line), a New York City subway station

== See also ==
- List of highways numbered 137
