= Resperion =

Road construction company

- Company type: Private
- Industry: Road Construction
- Headquarters: Scottsdale, AZ, U.S.
- Area served: Worldwide
- Key people: Josh Benveniste,CEO
- Products: IntegraBase; IntegraSeal; IntegraPave; EcoRAP

Resperion is a company based in Scottsdale, Arizona that is involved in the creation and development of a variety of products used in road construction, soil stabilization, dust control, and natural paving alternatives.

The company's main focus is on the modification of asphalt with its IntegraBase product. IntegraBase alters the chemical structure of asphalt, improving strength, temperature performance and longevity of roads. IntegraBase is only used in the sub-layers of pavement design (base/binder courses).

The company attracted a lot of global attention in 2003 when its IntegraBase product was selected for use in the Kabul–Kandahar Highway in Afghanistan, funded by USAID and contracted by the Louis Berger Group.

== History ==
Resperion, originally named Chemcrete USA, was formed in 1999 to manufacture, market and sell the Chemcrete Asphalt Modifier. Chemcrete was originally invented in the early 1980s in Abu Dhabi to stabilize sand mixes with bitumen. The original Chemcrete Technology had also been owned by both Koch Materials Company and Lubrizol at different times. The name change to Resperion, and the renaming of the Chemcrete product to IntegraBase occurred in 2004.

== Solutions ==
=== Asphalt modification ===
Resperion's IntegraBase modifier increases the strength of hot mix asphalt Base and Binder courses while also improving fatigue life. The increased strength from the binding technology enables thickness reductions while reducing costs and time needed to build without sacrificing any performance or longevity of the pavement. IntegraBase also provides for improved high temperature performance, retaining strength in warm temperatures while withstanding typically deleterious thermal cycling. IntegraBase's binding technology also improves wet strength and improves water stripping properties (separation of the bitumen from the aggregate). The binding strength of IntegraBase also enables the construction of roads with marginal aggregates, allowing contractors to use local materials.

IntegraBase is a multi-metallic catalyst (MMC) in asphalt soluble form. When mixed with asphalt cement and aggregates, this catalyst initiates a series of chemical reactions which ultimately cross link the asphalt molecules and consume the catalyst; this reaction creates an Organic Metallic Complex, the strongest bond in all of chemistry. The new higher-molecular-weight materials created are extremely resistant to heat and heavy loads. They also exhibit superior water resistance and anti-stripping properties.

=== Dust control/soil stabilization ===
Resperion's IntegraSeal is a 100% natural product based on a Tall Oil Pitch emulsion used to bind soil for a number of applications including dust control, erosion control, soil stabilization, haul roads.

=== Natural paving ===
Resperion also has solutions based on their Tall Oil Pitch emulsion which can be used to construct 100% natural pavements as well as being used with Recycled Asphalt as a substitute for bitumen.

== Notable projects ==
=== Kabul/Kandahar highway project ===
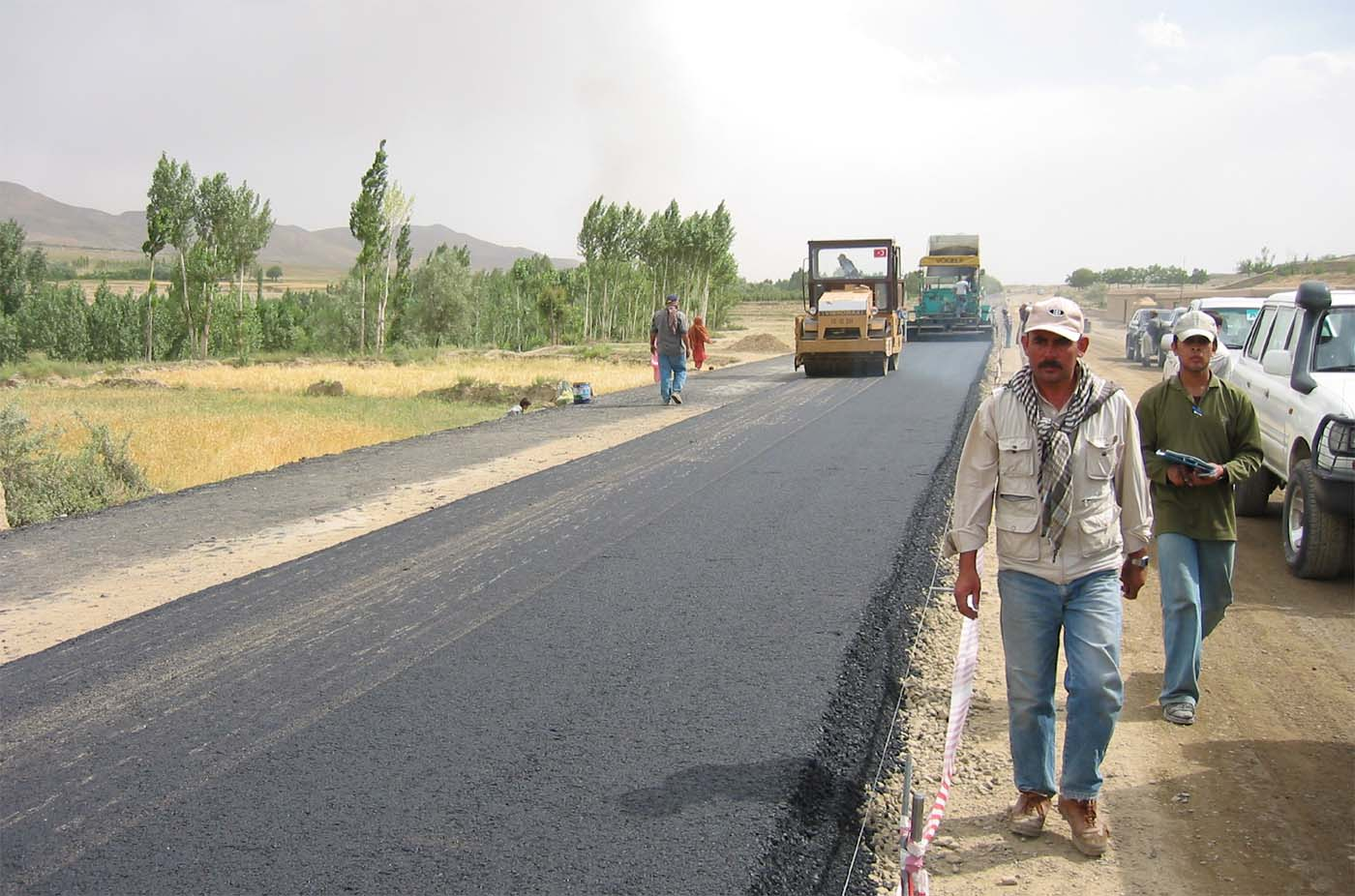
IntegraBase basecourse is compacted on Kabul–Kandahar Highway

IntegraBase was used to modify the basecourse of the Kabul–Kandahar Highway in 2003. IntegraBase enabled the Louis Berger Group to modify the original pavement design for the road, eliminating a sub layer of aggregate and decreasing the original basecourse thickness of 14 inches to 8 inches. With the use of the modifier, the Louis Berger Group was able to use local aggregates in the mix design. It was estimated that the use of the IntegraBase product saved $90 million for the project from the reduction of asphalt used, the use of river run-gravel, and the decreased time of construction.

The Kabul–Kandahar Highway was in major disrepair due to over two decades of war and neglect. The United States funded the repair and rebuilding of 389 kilometers of road, while Japan funded 50 kilometers. 43 kilometers of the highway were already usable prior to the repairs. The rebuilding project was overseen by the Louis Berger Group, with assistance in planning and design by Turkish and Indian engineers. Phase one of paving was completed in December 2003 and the highway was opened to traffic. The journey used to take travelers two days but now takes about 6 hours.

=== State Route 138 (California) ===
IntegraBase is being tested by Caltrans in their quest to construct higher-quality and longer-lasting roads. Resperion and Caltrans have been working together for numerous years in an attempt to refine the technical guidance and specifications written for higher strength asphalt concrete base in order to allow its routine use cost effectively on California State Highway projects. Caltrans utilized IntegraBase in the basecourse in a section of State Route 138 near Palmdale, California in 2006/2007.

== Leadership ==
Josh Benveniste – CEO

== Product distribution ==
Resperion sells its products globally through a vast array of partnerships and distributors.
