= List of highways numbered 139 =

Highway 139 may refer to:

== Australia ==
Toowoomba Athol Road QLD

== Canada ==
- Prince Edward Island Route 139
- Quebec Route 139

== Costa Rica ==
- National Route 139

== India ==
- National Highway 139 (India)

== Japan ==
- Japan National Route 139
- Fukuoka Prefectural Route 139
- Nara Prefectural Route 139

== Malaysia ==
- Malaysia Federal Route 139

== United Kingdom ==
- A139 road

== United States ==
- Alabama State Route 139
- Arkansas Highway 139
- California State Route 139
- Colorado State Highway 139
- Connecticut Route 139
- Florida State Road 139
  - County Road 139 (Baker County, Florida)
    - County Road 139B (Baker County, Florida)
  - County Road 139 (Jefferson County, Florida)
- Georgia State Route 139
- Hawaii Route 139
- Illinois Route 139 (former)
- Iowa Highway 139
- K-139 (Kansas highway)
- Kentucky Route 139
- Louisiana Highway 139
- Maine State Route 139
- Maryland Route 139
- Massachusetts Route 139
- M-139 (Michigan highway)
- Minnesota State Highway 139
- Missouri Route 139
- New Jersey Route 139
- New York State Route 139
  - County Route 139 (Erie County, New York)
  - County Route 139 (Monroe County, New York)
  - County Route 139 (Niagara County, New York)
  - County Route 139 (Seneca County, New York)
  - County Route 139 (Westchester County, New York)
- Ohio State Route 139
- Pennsylvania Route 139 (former)
- South Dakota Highway 139 (former)
- Tennessee State Route 139
- Texas State Highway 139 (former)
  - Texas State Highway Loop 139 (former)
  - Texas State Highway Spur 139
  - Farm to Market Road 139
- Utah State Route 139
- Vermont Route 139
- Virginia State Route 139
  - Virginia State Route 139 (1931-1933) (former)
  - Virginia State Route 139 (1933-1942) (former)
- Wisconsin Highway 139
- Wyoming Highway 139

Territories

- Puerto Rico Highway 139
  - Puerto Rico Highway 139R

Preceded by 138	Lists of highways 139	Succeeded by 140
