= Bijjur =

- village
- Country: India
- State: Karnataka
- District: Uttara Kannada
- Elevation: 586 m (1,923 ft)

Languages
  - Official: Kannada
- Time zone: UTC+5:30 (IST)
- PIN: 581326
- Telephone code: 8386 areacode

Bijjur is a small village of gokarna in Uttar Kannada district are neighbouring villages in a valley in the south western section of Karnataka, India. Together they form a community of people from different castes and religions.

Just to the north of the village, the Gangavali River joins the Arabian Sea. The town of Gokarna is just to the south of the village. The surrounding Sahyadri Mountains hug the Arabian sea; the open fields provide recreational opportunities to the locals. It has creeks and shallow ponds and bridges vulnerable to rainy seasons.

== Location ==
The village is 515 km from Bangalore, 232 km north of Mangalore and 63 km from Karwar. It is between the Gangavali and Agnashini rivers and situated along the Karwar coast by the Arabian Sea. It is near to college towns Ankola, Kumta, Suratkal and Manipal.

== Climate ==
- Summer : March - mid June,
- Rainy : Mid June–October
- Winter : November–February.

Since the town is located on the coast, it has a moderate climate, with temperatures in the range of 28^{c} to 36^{c} during summer and 26^{c} to 20^{c} during winter. The rainy season has heavy rains by the south-west Monsoon. Average annual rainfall is about 3000 mm.

== Community festivals ==
- Suggihabba of the surrounding communities
- Shri Sadguru Swami Shamanand Maharaj Jayanti Utsav
- Bijjur has cultural activities like Yakshagana and dramas from the localities.

Tabloids and well-known Hagarana are their cultural richness in suggihabba

== Schools ==
- Primary school - Rudrapada

== Religious Significance ==
- Samadhi Mandir of Shri Sadguru Swami Shamanand Maharaj

Shri Sadguru Swami Shamanand Maharaj was born in the year 1927 near Udupi in Karnataka in ‘Padhmanabh Vaishnavpathith Brahman’ family. In the Year 1940 Swami left his home in pursuit of spiritual awakening (DIKHSA); which was offered to him when he was about 18 Years Old.

Swami Shamanand Ji continued his Sadhana for years, achieved furthermore enlightenments, sacred power, bliss and his Prasad (religious offering consumed by worshippers) have healing power. Swami Ji returned to Karnataka in the Year 1975 and took shelter in a shed at Mr. Gandadhar Joglekar's Baug for some years, then founded ASHRAM in Bijjur, Karnataka.

Swami Ji's godliness & miracles brought all followers together as one family irrespective of their religion, caste and social status. In his teaching he encouraged people to believe in Sakhol Satya (Pure Truth) and Simplicity, he wanted people to work for the betterment of society and not to achieve fame.

Until Shri Swami Shamanand Ji took SAMADHI (Dated 23 January 1989, Time: 04:20 Minutes) he stressed on the importance of sharing; knowledge, water the thirsty, food to hungry and clothes to the needy, he repeatedly encouraged the followers to offer at least 5% of their earnings towards charity.
