= List of highways numbered 143 =

The following highways are numbered 143:

== Canada ==
- Prince Edward Island Route 143
- Quebec Route 143

== Costa Rica ==
- National Route 143

== Germany ==
- Bundesautobahn 143

== Japan ==
- Japan National Route 143
- Fukuoka Prefectural Route 143
- Nara Prefectural Route 143

== Malaysia ==
- Malaysia Federal Route 143

== United Kingdom ==
- A143 road

== United States ==
- U.S. Highway 143 (former)
- Alabama State Route 143
- Arizona State Route 143
- Arkansas Highway 143
- California State Route 143 (unbuilt)
- Florida State Road 143
  - County Road 143 (Hamilton County, Florida)
- Georgia State Route 143 (former)
- Illinois Route 143
- Indiana State Road 143
- Iowa Highway 143
- K-143 (Kansas highway)
- Kentucky Route 143
- Louisiana Highway 143
- Maine State Route 143
- Maryland Route 143 (former)
- Massachusetts Route 143
- M-143 (Michigan highway) (one former and one current highway)
- Missouri Route 143
- New Jersey Route 143
- New Mexico State Road 143
- New York State Route 143
  - County Route 143 (Fulton County, New York)
  - County Route 143 (Niagara County, New York)
  - County Route 143 (Wayne County, New York)
  - County Route 143 (Westchester County, New York)
- North Carolina Highway 143
- Ohio State Route 143
- Oklahoma State Highway 143 (former)
- Pennsylvania Route 143
- Tennessee State Route 143
- Texas State Highway 143 (former)
  - Texas State Highway Loop 143
  - Texas State Highway Spur 143 (former)
  - Farm to Market Road 143
- Utah State Route 143
- Vermont Route 143
- Virginia State Route 143
  - Virginia State Route 143 (1923-1928) (former)
  - Virginia State Route 143 (1933-1942) (former)
- Washington State Route 143 (two former highways)
- Wisconsin Highway 143

Territories

- Puerto Rico Highway 143

Preceded by 142	Lists of highways 143	Succeeded by 144
