= Gokarna, Karnataka =

Tourist destination in Karnataka

Gokarna
- town
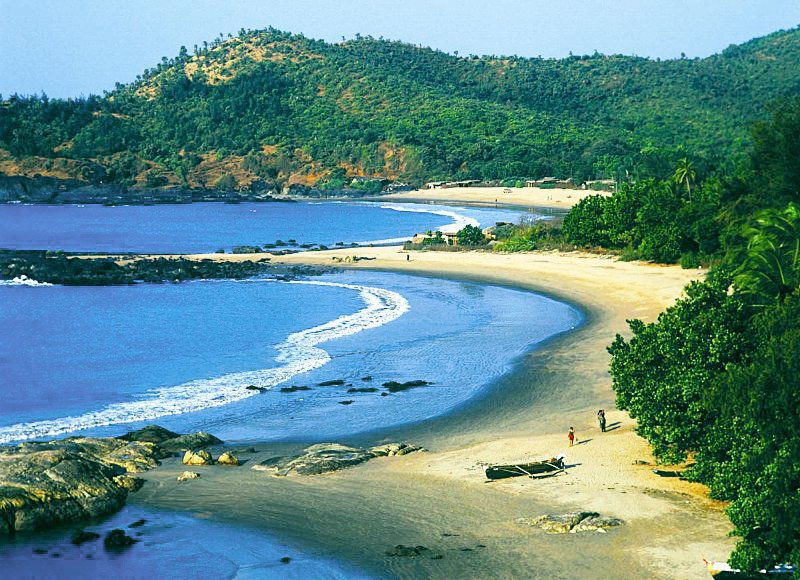
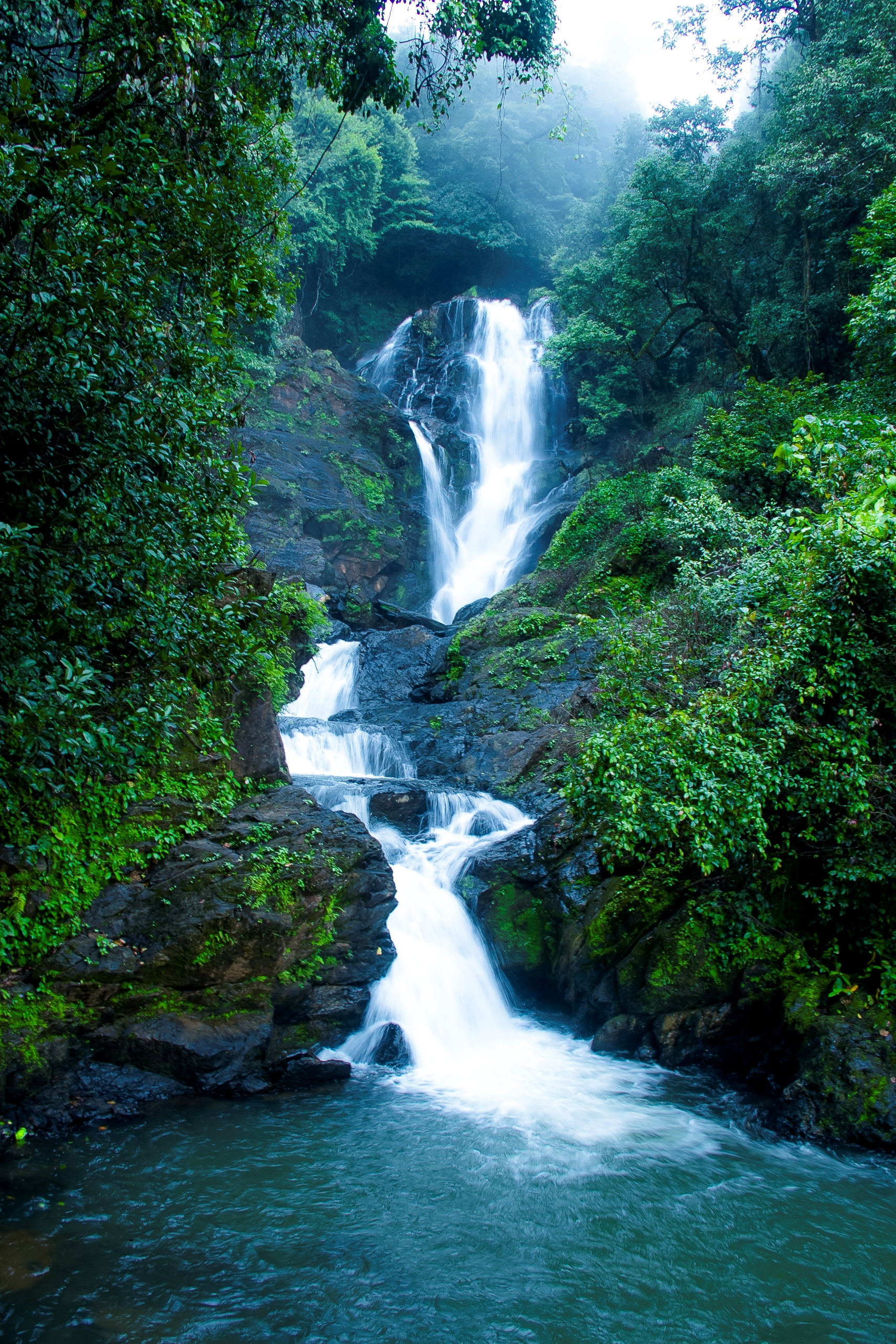
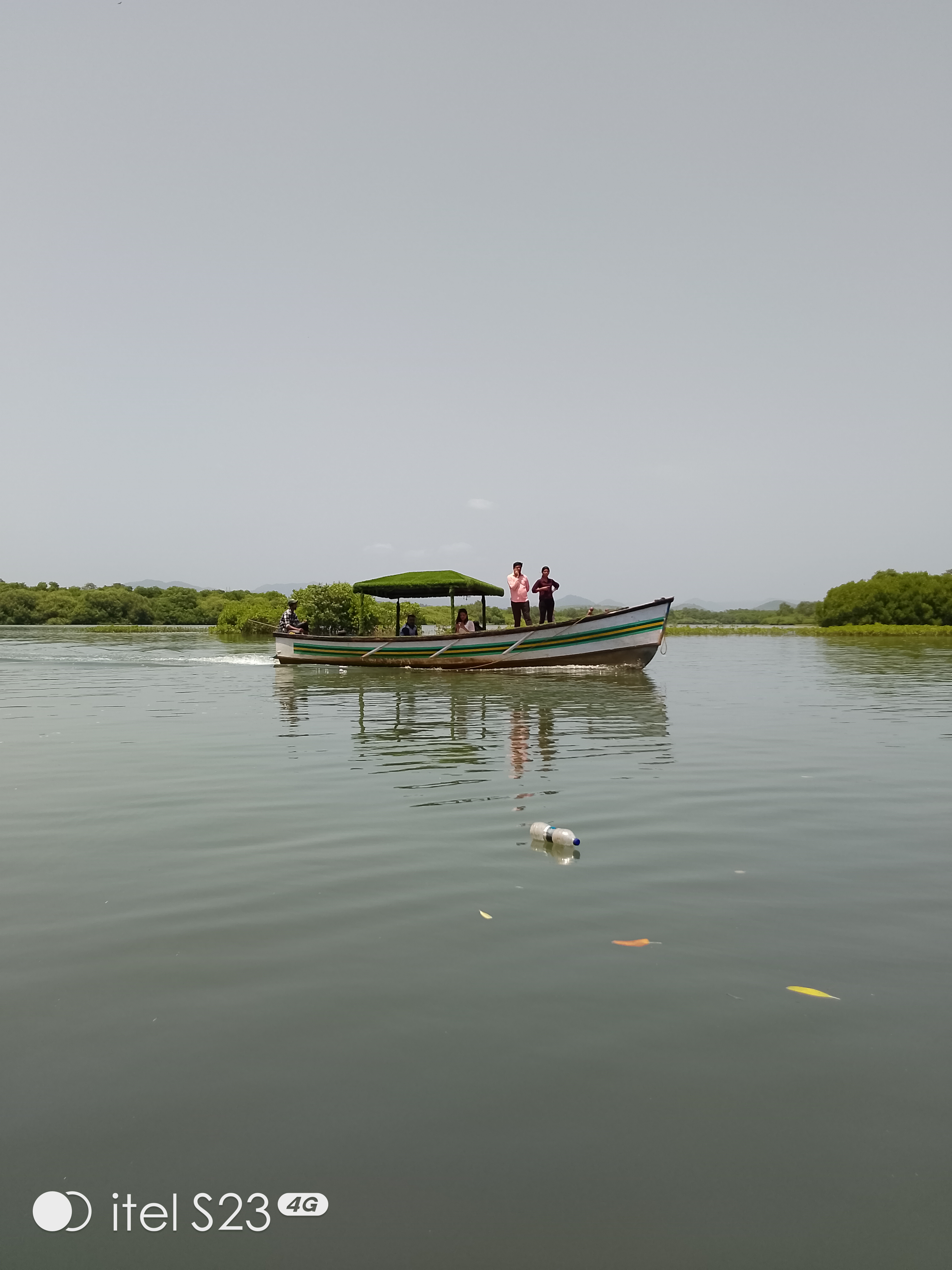
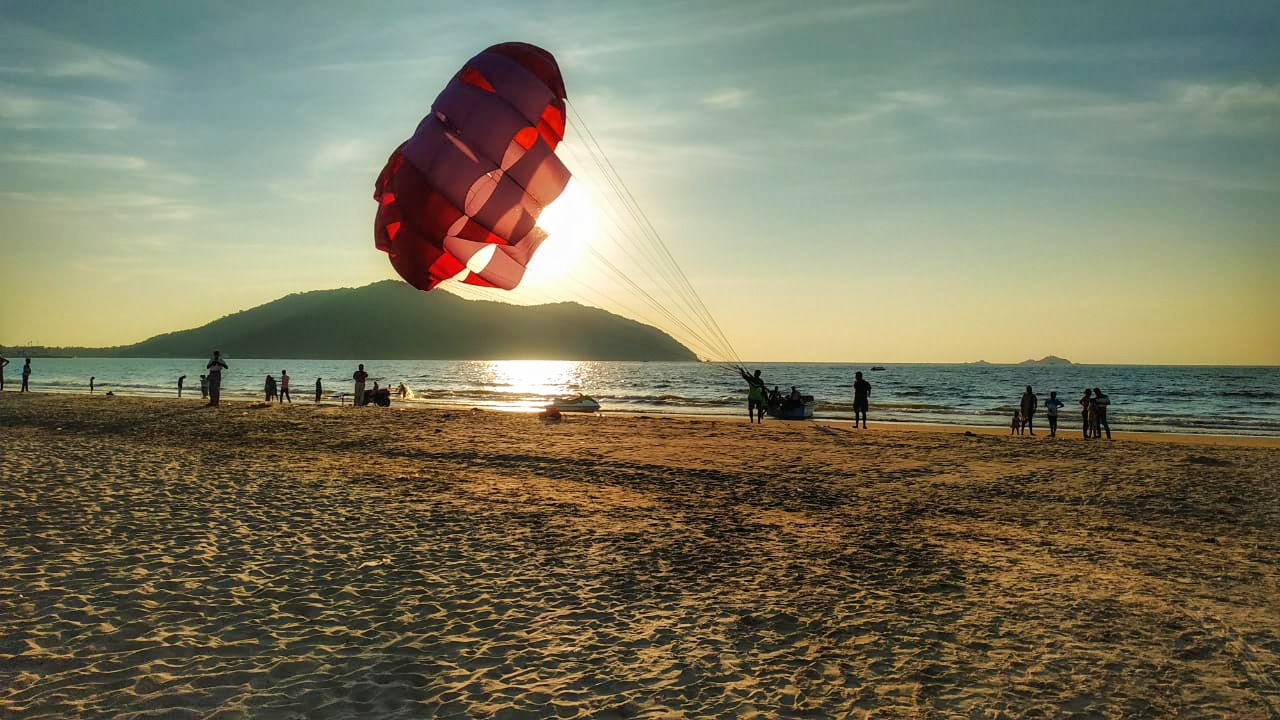
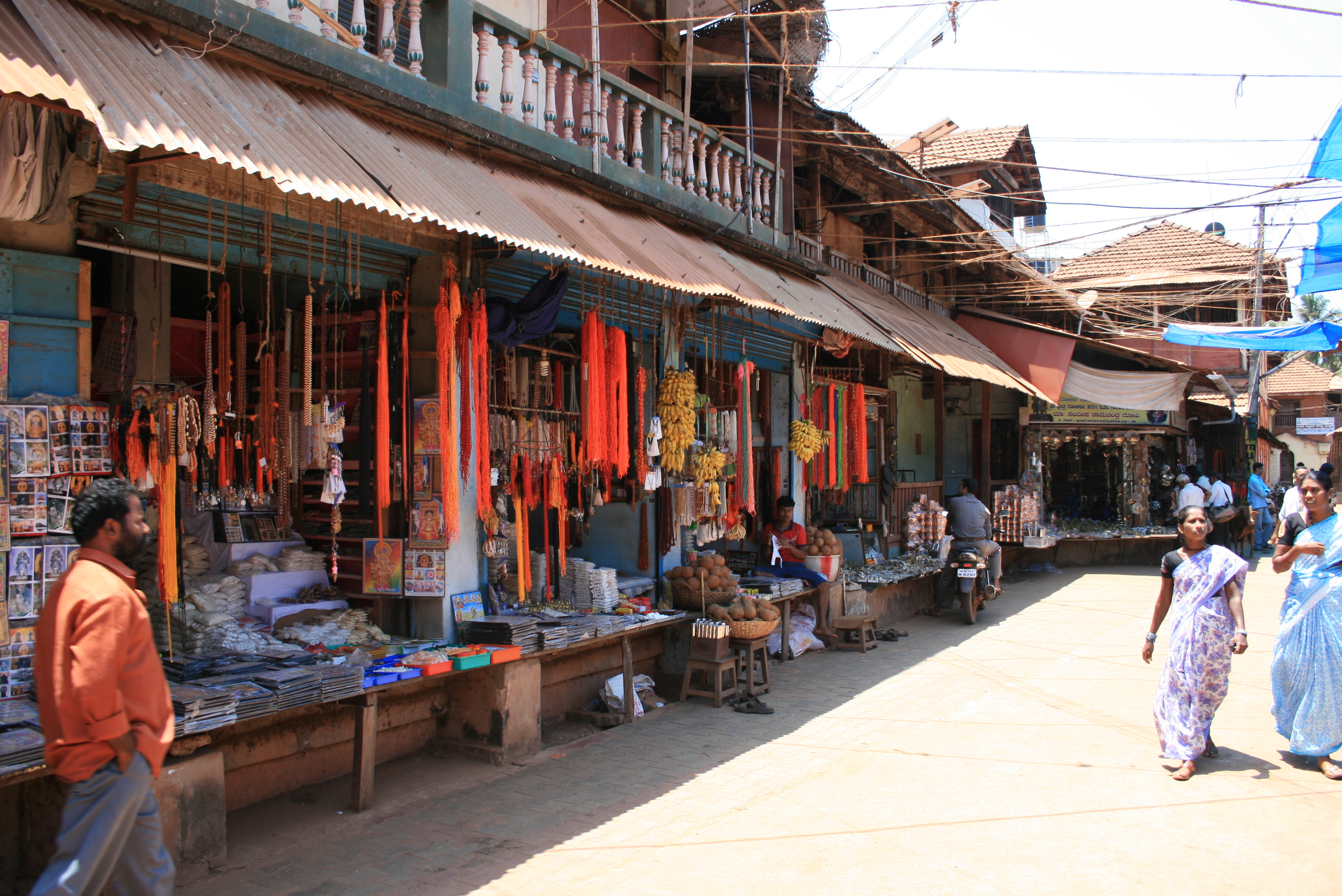
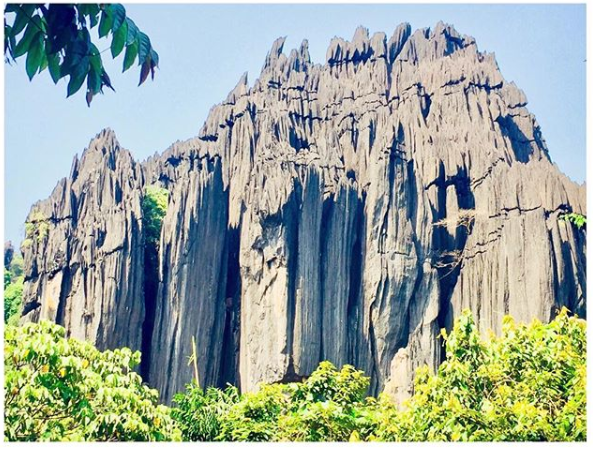
- From top: View from Gokarna Om Beach, Vibhuthi Falls, Honnavar backwaters, Karwar beach, Gokarna Town, Yana caves

- Location in Karnataka, India Gokarna (Kerala) Gokarna (India)
- Coordinates: 14.55°N 74.31667°E
- Country: India
- State: Karnataka
- Region: Karavali
- District: Uttara Kannada
- Tehsil: Kumta

Area
  - Total: 10.9 km^{2} (4.2 sq mi)
- Elevation: 22 m (72 ft)

Population (2001)
  - Total: 25,851
  - Density: 2,370/km^{2} (6,140/sq mi)

Languages
  - Official: Kannada
- Time zone: UTC+5:30 (IST)
- Vehicle registration: KA-47
- Website: uttarakannada.nic.in/tourism.html

Gokarna is a historical temple town located in the Uttara Kannada district of Karnataka state in southern India, The town is famous for the 4th century Mahabaleshwar Temple, dedicated to the Hindu God Shiva, the Bhadrakali Temple dedicated to Goddess Uma and Maha Ganpati Temple dedicated to Hindu God Ganesha. Gokarna is mentioned in the Hindu epic Mahabharata and by the classical Sanskrit poet Kalidasa in his 4th-century work Raghuvamsha, where he refers to the "Lord of Gokarna".

Gokarna is one of the most popular beach destinations for tourists in India. It is popular with beach trekkers. Yana Caves hosts the second cleanest village in India.

== Etymology ==
According to legend Brahma, feeling proud because he could create the universe, decided to meditate to apologize for his arrogance. He wanted to lift a curse given by Shiva. During his meditation, Shiva appeared unexpectedly, emerging from the ears of a cow. So the place came to be known as Gokarna or ear of the cow. The Puranas state that when Parashurama, the sixth avatar of Vishnu created Kerala, it was from Gokarna to Kanyakumari.

== Legend ==
The mythological origins of Gokarna are traditionally set in the Treta Yuga. According to the Skanda Purana and the Ananda Ramayana, the narrative begins with the demon king Ravana of Lanka performing rigorous penance at Mount Kailash. This was motivated by his mother, Kaikesi, who expressed a deep desire to worship the Atmalinga (the soul-lingam) of Shiva for her personal salvation. Pleased by Ravana's devotion, Shiva granted him the Atmalinga on the strict condition that it would become permanently rooted wherever it was first placed on the earth.

As Ravana traveled south toward Lanka, the gods (Devas), fearing the king would become invincible with the Lingam, sought the help of Ganesha. When Ravana reached the western coast at sunset, he needed to perform his evening sandhya rituals but could not put the Lingam down. Ganesha, disguised as a young cowherd, offered to hold the Lingam. However, Ganesha intentionally called out Ravana's name three times and, receiving no immediate response, placed the Atmalinga on the ground at Gokarna, where it immediately became immovable.

In a fit of rage, Ravana attempted to uproot the Lingam with immense force. Though he failed to move the base, the pressure caused the Lingam to take the shape of a cow's ear, giving the town the name Gokarna (Sanskrit: Gokarṇa, "cow's ear"). The pieces of the casing that were shattered by Ravana’s strength are said to have flown in different directions, forming other sacred sites in the region: Sajjeswara, Dhareshwara, Gunavanteshwara, and Murdeshwara. The main body of the Lingam remained at Gokarna and is worshipped as Mahabaleshwar (The All-Powerful).

== History ==
=== Antiquity and Classical Mentions ===
Gokarna is one of the oldest continuously inhabited sacred centers on the western coast of India. Its significance in ancient times is corroborated by its mention in the Mahabharata and Kalidasa (c. 4th Century CE): In the epic poem Raghuvaṃśa, Kalidasa describes King Raghu reaching the shores of the southern ocean and worshipping the "Lord of Gokarna" (Canto VIII, Verse 33). This serves as one of the earliest secular literary references to the site as a major center of Shaivism. The Skanda Purana (Gokarna Khanda) and the Bhagavata Purana categorize Gokarna as a Muktikshetra (Place of Liberation). The site is geographically linked to the "Parashurama Kshetra," the land legendarily reclaimed from the sea by the sage Parashurama.

=== The Kadamba Dynasty ===
The formal institutionalization of the Gokarna Temple complex occurred under the Kadamba dynasty (c. 345–525 CE) and the earliest structural temple of Mahabaleshwar is attributed to King Mayurasharma, the founder of the Kadamba dynasty.

=== Vijayanagara Empire and later ===
Between the 14th and 16th centuries, the Vijayanagara Empire rulers like Bukka Raya I, Harihara I and other royalty donated land and expanded the temple complex. Vijayanagara inscriptions record grants made for the "Mahabaleshwar Puja" and the maintenance of pilgrims.

Following the decline of Vijayanagara, the Nayakas of Sonda (Sodhe) acted as the primary protectors of the shrine. They defended the coast against naval incursions and continued the tradition of land endowments.

== Geography ==
=== Location ===
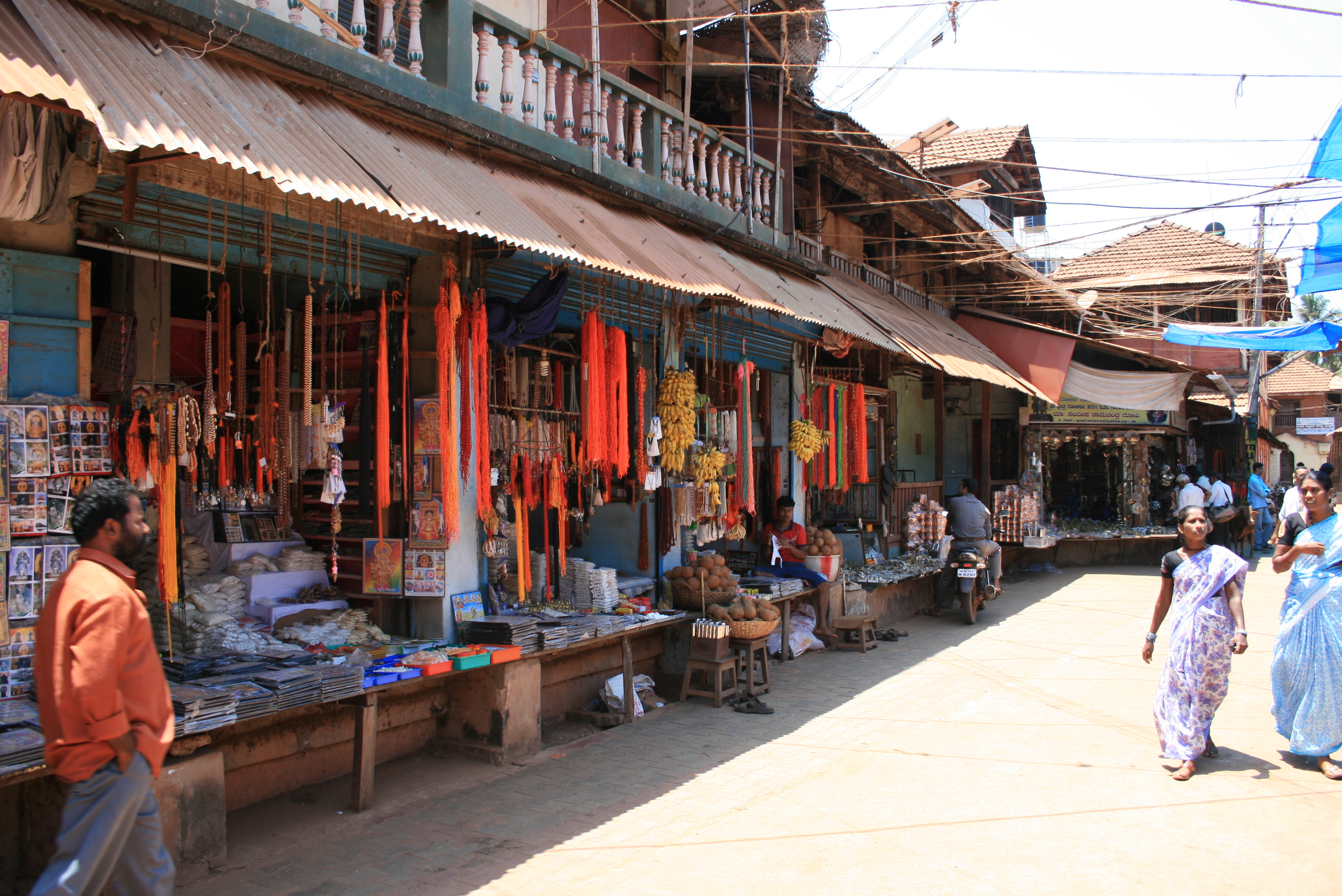
Gokarna township

Gokarna is about 238 km north of Mangalore, 483 km from Bengaluru and about 59 km from Karwar. It is between the Gangavalli River and Aghanashini river along the Karwar coast by the Arabian Sea. It is 200 km north from the college towns of Suratkal and Manipal.

It can be reached by Konkan Railway on the Mumbai to Mangalore route or Goa to Mangalore route. The railway station (called Gokarna Road) is 10 km from the town. The station has a retiring room at a nominal price. Many important trains like Matsyagandha Express, KSR Bengaluru Karwar Express, Poorna Express, Marusagar Express and Mangalore Local and DEMU local are the Daily Local Trains halt here.

The nearest airports are Hubli Airport, Karnataka which has domestic flights only, Goa International Airport at Goa and Mangalore International Airport at Bajpe, Karnataka are the nearest airports to reach at Gokarna.

Neighbouring villages are Bankikodla-Hanehalli, Sanikatta, Tadadi, Torke, Madangere, Maskeri, Adigone, Nelaguni and Bijjur.

=== Climate ===
Climate data for Gokarna
Month	Jan	Feb	Mar	Apr	May	Jun	Jul	Aug	Sep	Oct	Nov	Dec	Year
Mean daily maximum °C (°F)	31.8 (89.2)	31.4 (88.5)	32.3 (90.1)	33.0 (91.4)	29.5 (85.1)	29.8 (85.6)	28.7 (83.7)	28.6 (83.5)	29.1 (84.4)	30.9 (87.6)	32.3 (90.1)	32.3 (90.1)	30.8 (87.4)
Mean daily minimum °C (°F)	20.1 (68.2)	20.7 (69.3)	23.0 (73.4)	25.4 (77.7)	26.1 (79.0)	24.3 (75.7)	23.8 (74.8)	23.8 (74.8)	23.4 (74.1)	23.4 (74.1)	22.1 (71.8)	20.9 (69.6)	23.1 (73.5)
Average precipitation mm (inches)	0 (0)	0 (0)	1 (0.0)	11 (0.4)	184 (7.2)	980 (38.6)	1,227 (48.3)	665 (26.2)	366 (14.4)	157 (6.2)	49 (1.9)	9 (0.4)	3,649 (143.6)
Source: http://en.climate-data.org/location/172162/

== Flora and fauna ==
Gokarna is situated within the densely forested tropical regions of the Western Ghats. The area surrounding Gokarna contains biodiverse and interdependent forest ecosystems that provide habitat for numerous mammals, reptiles and amphibians. Owing to its location along the Arabian Sea, the western part of Gokarna also supports rich marine fauna and coastal biodiversity. The sandy shoreline and salt-tolerant vegetation provide habitat for a wide variety of birds and marine species such as the olive ridley sea turtle, groupers, parrotfish, crabs and mussels.

Gokarna's wetlands include mangroves and marshes that serve as breeding and feeding grounds for both resident and migratory birds. Species recorded in the region include kingfishers, sandpipers, the Indian peafowl, Asian koel and the black-headed ibis.

=== Mammals ===
Numerous bonnet macaques are commonly found near the temple complexes in Gokarna that are heavily frequented by tourists. The most commonly encountered mammal in the forests surrounding Gokarna is the wild boar (Sus scrofa). Populations of the Bengal fox (Vulpes bengalensis), golden jackal (Canis aureus) and Asian palm civet (Paradoxurus hermaphroditus) are also known from the area.

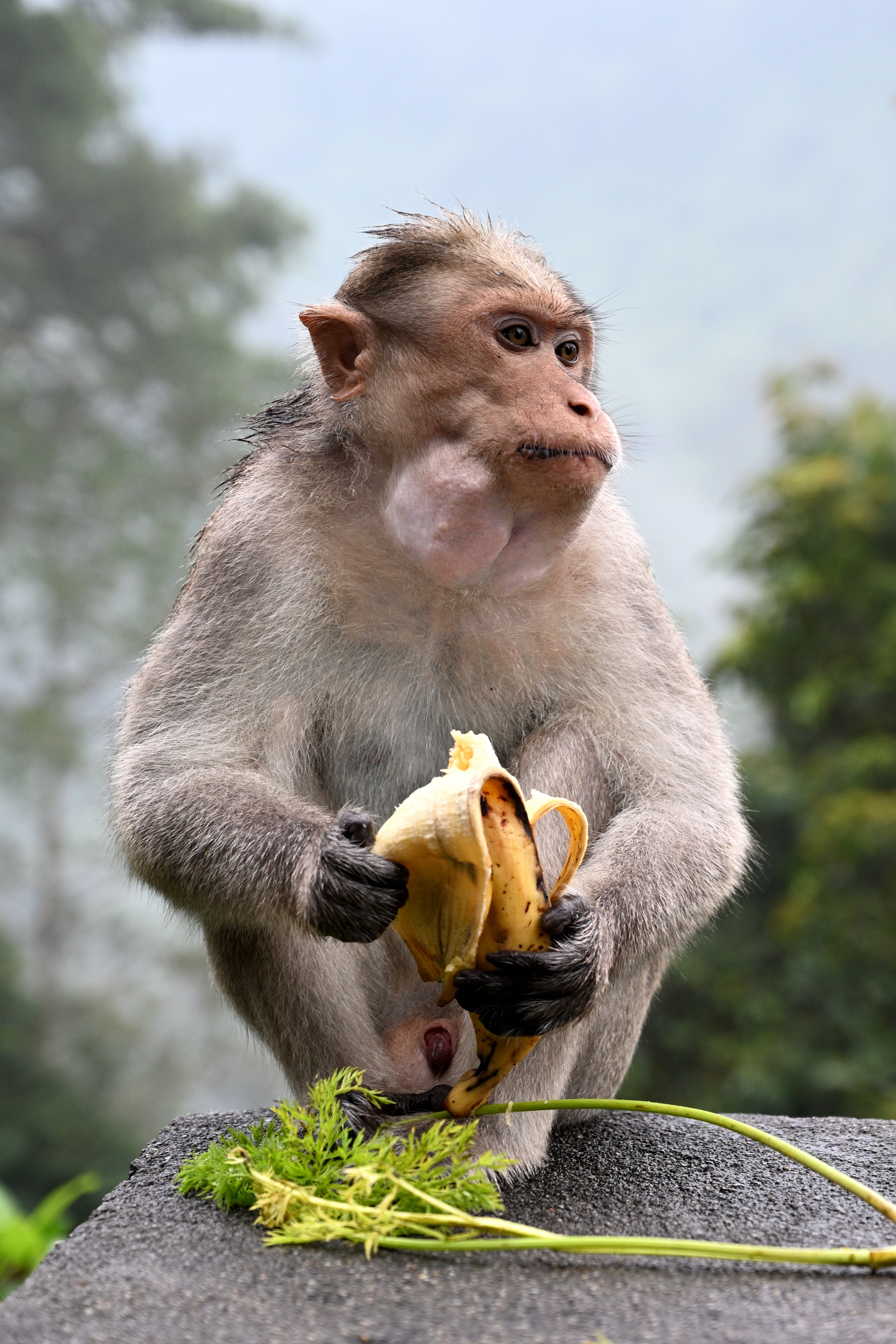
Bonnet macaque
Macaca radiata

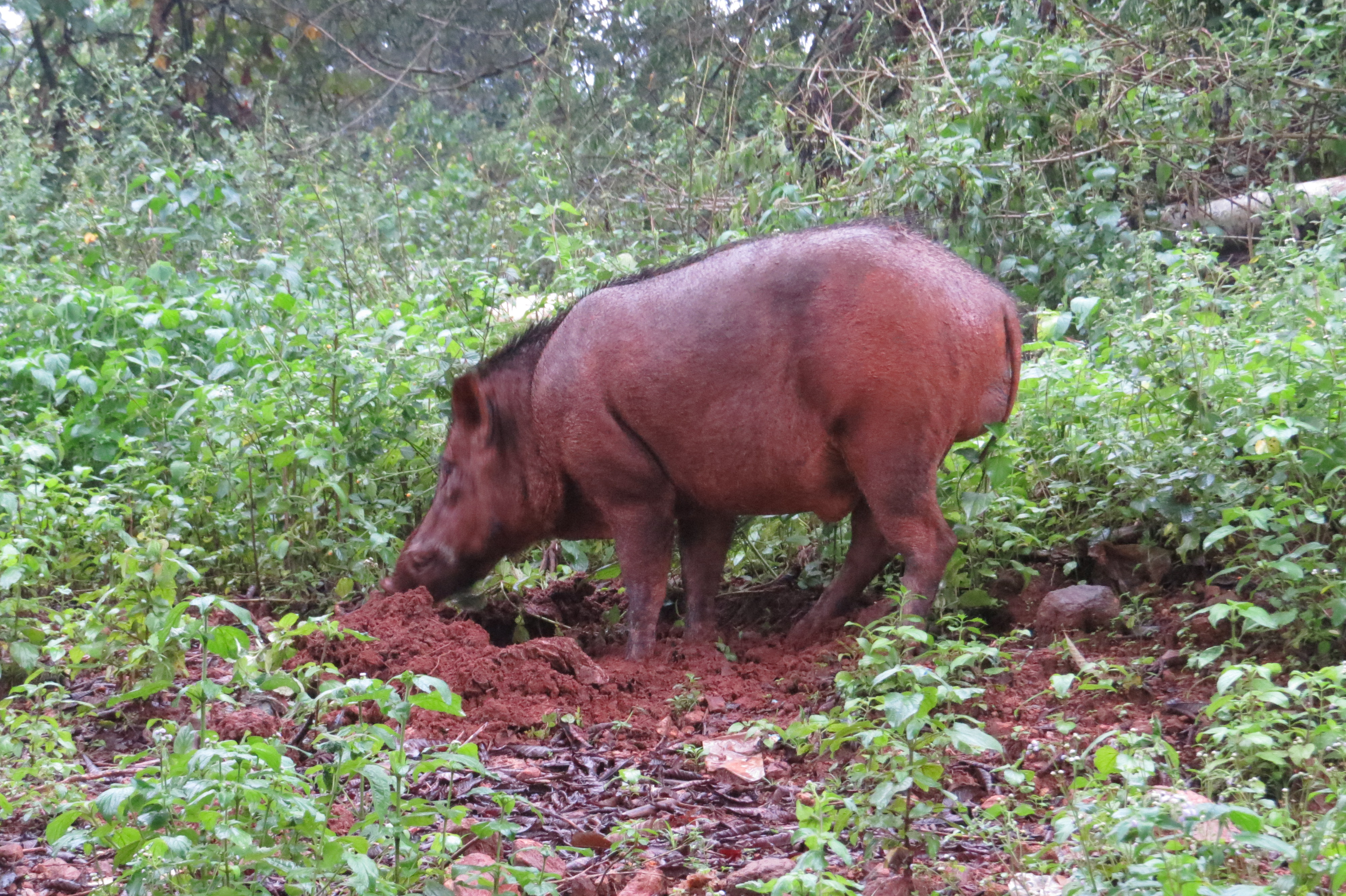
Wild boar
Sus scrofa

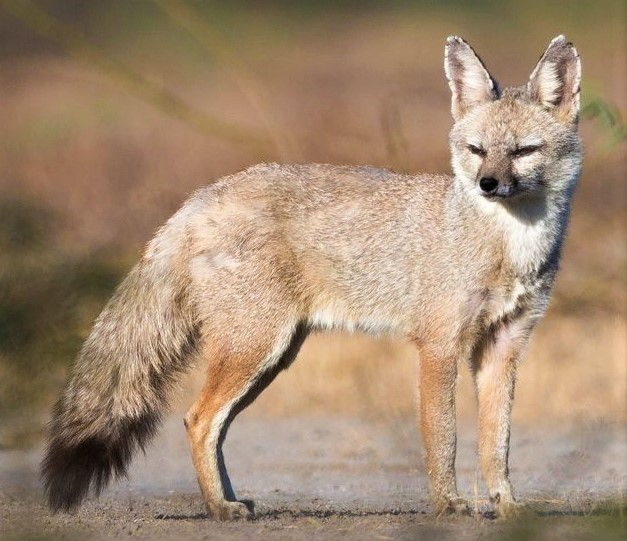
Bengal fox
Vulpes bengalensis

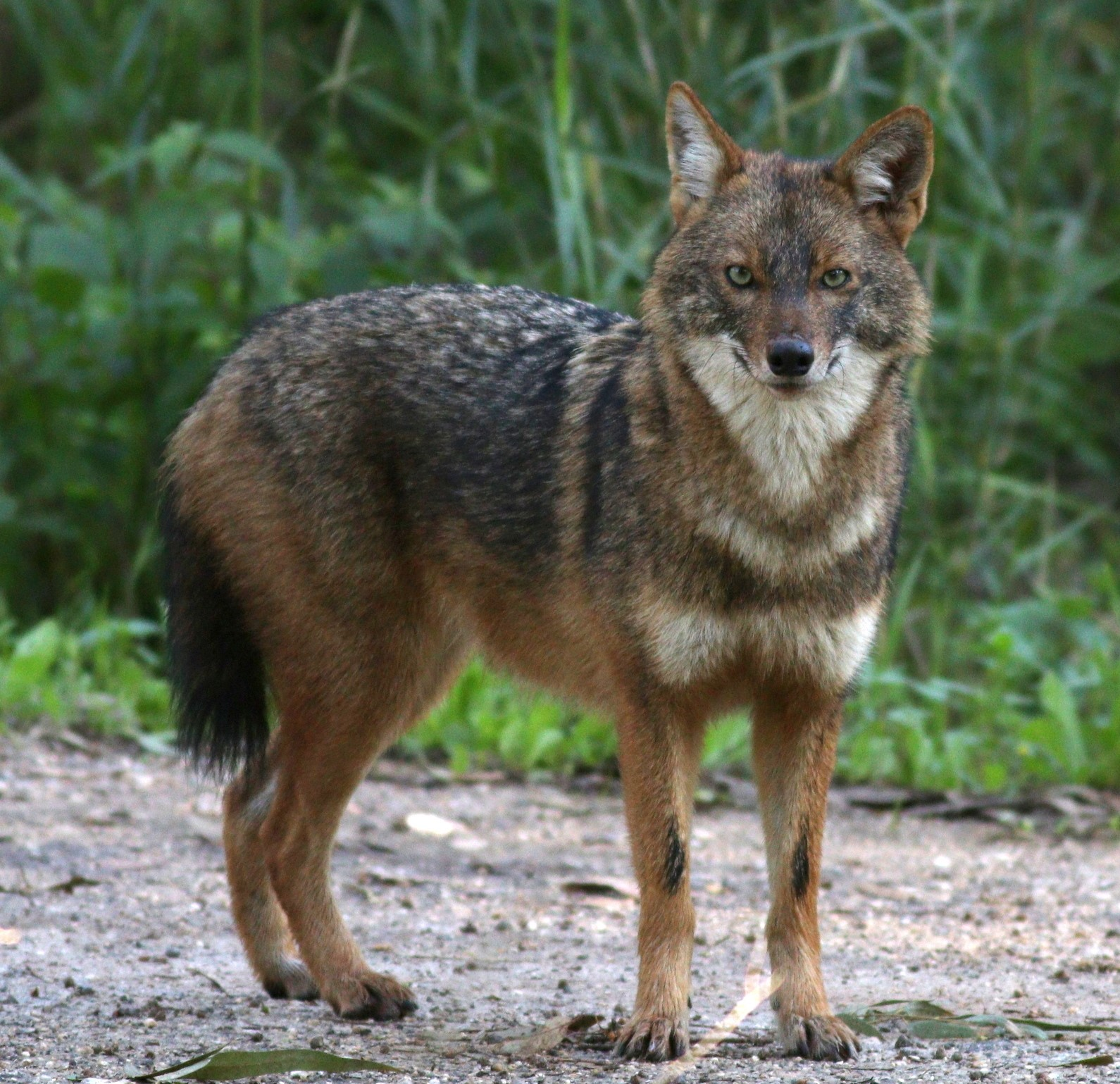
Golden jackal
Canis aureus

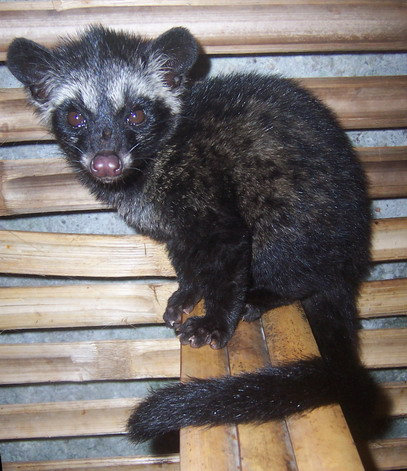
Asian palm civet
Paradoxurus hermaphroditus

=== Reptiles and amphibians ===
The forests surrounding Gokarna are designated bird sanctuary areas and also provide protected habitat for numerous reptiles and amphibians. The presence of the Indian cobra (Naja naja) is regarded as an indicator of the ecological health and balance of the forests and ecosystems around Gokarna. Other venomous snakes found in the region include Russell's viper (Daboia russelii) and the common krait (Bungarus caeruleus). These three venomous snake species belong to the so-called Big Four of the Indian subcontinent, which are responsible for the majority of fatal snakebites in the region.

The Indian state of Karnataka has reported a sharp rise in snakebite cases in recent years. The number of reported cases increased from 950 in 2021 to 16,805 in 2025. Since 2023, 277 people in Karnataka have died following snakebites, giving the state the highest number of snakebite fatalities among Indian states.

The Bengal monitor (Varanus bengalensis) is also found in the Gokarna region. A group of forest officials known as the "Daring Team" successfully captured several mugger crocodiles in the Gokarna area.

The protected areas surrounding Gokarna also host a variety of amphibians, particularly frogs and toads. One notable species is the Indian bullfrog (Hoplobatrachus tigerinus), which inhabits the wetlands of the region.

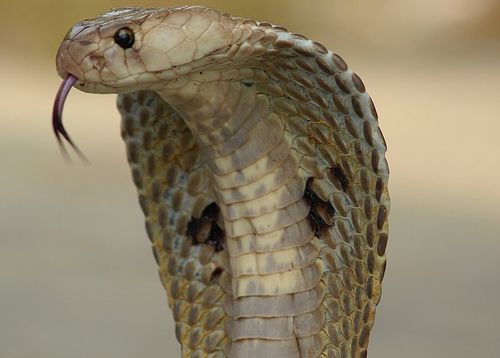
Indian cobra
Naja naja

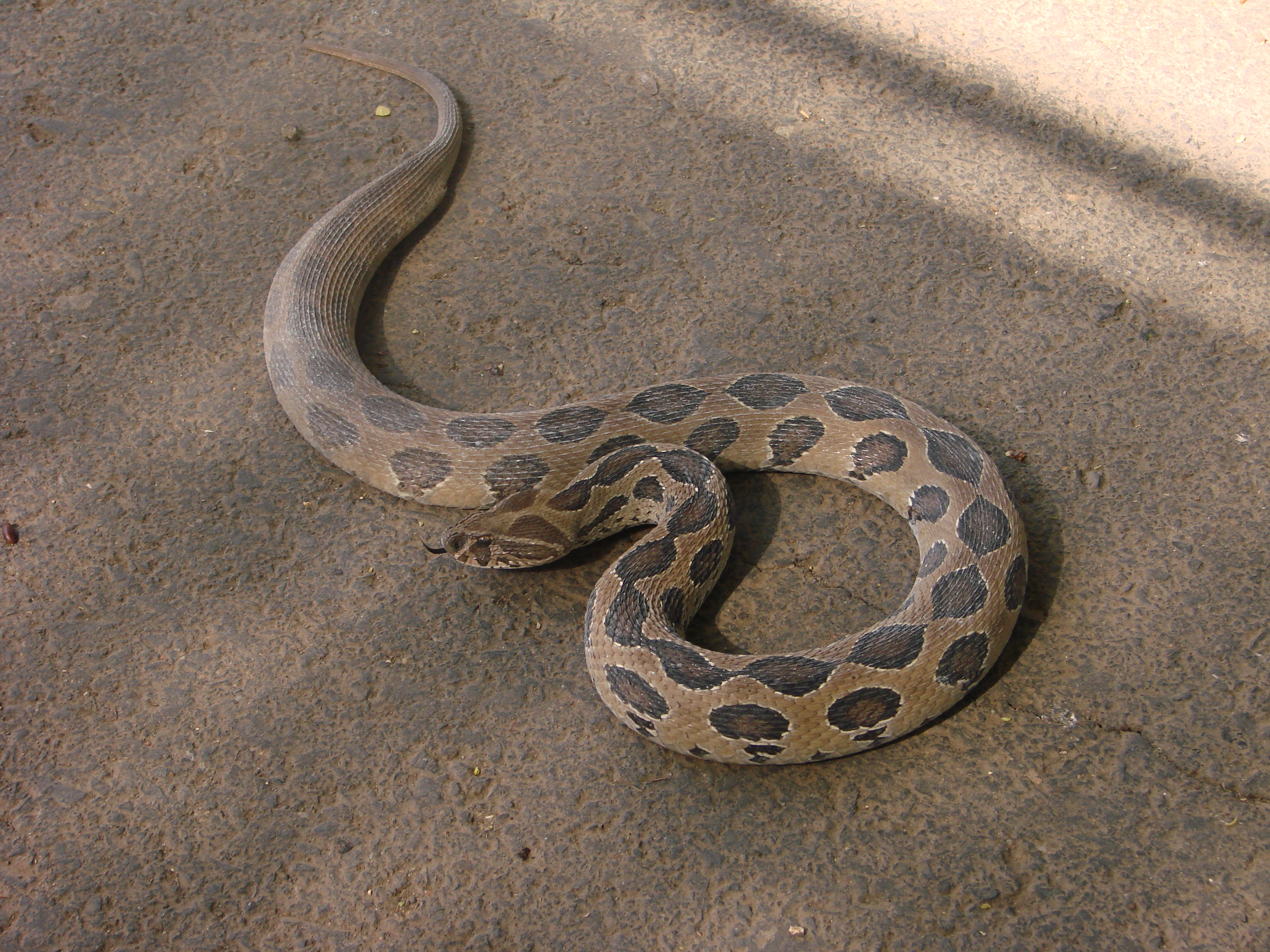
Russell's viper
Daboia russelii

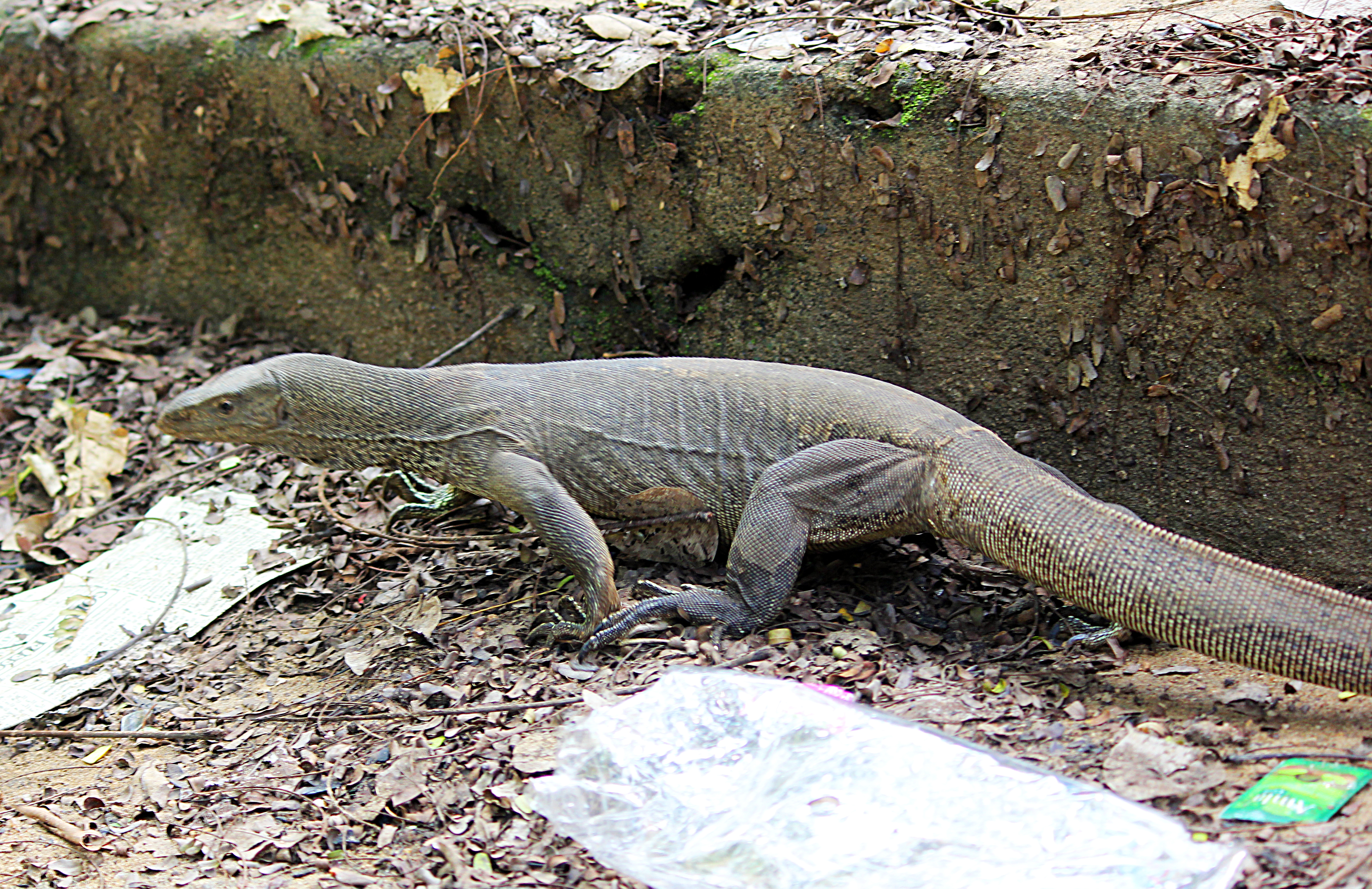
Bengal monitor
Varanus bengalensis

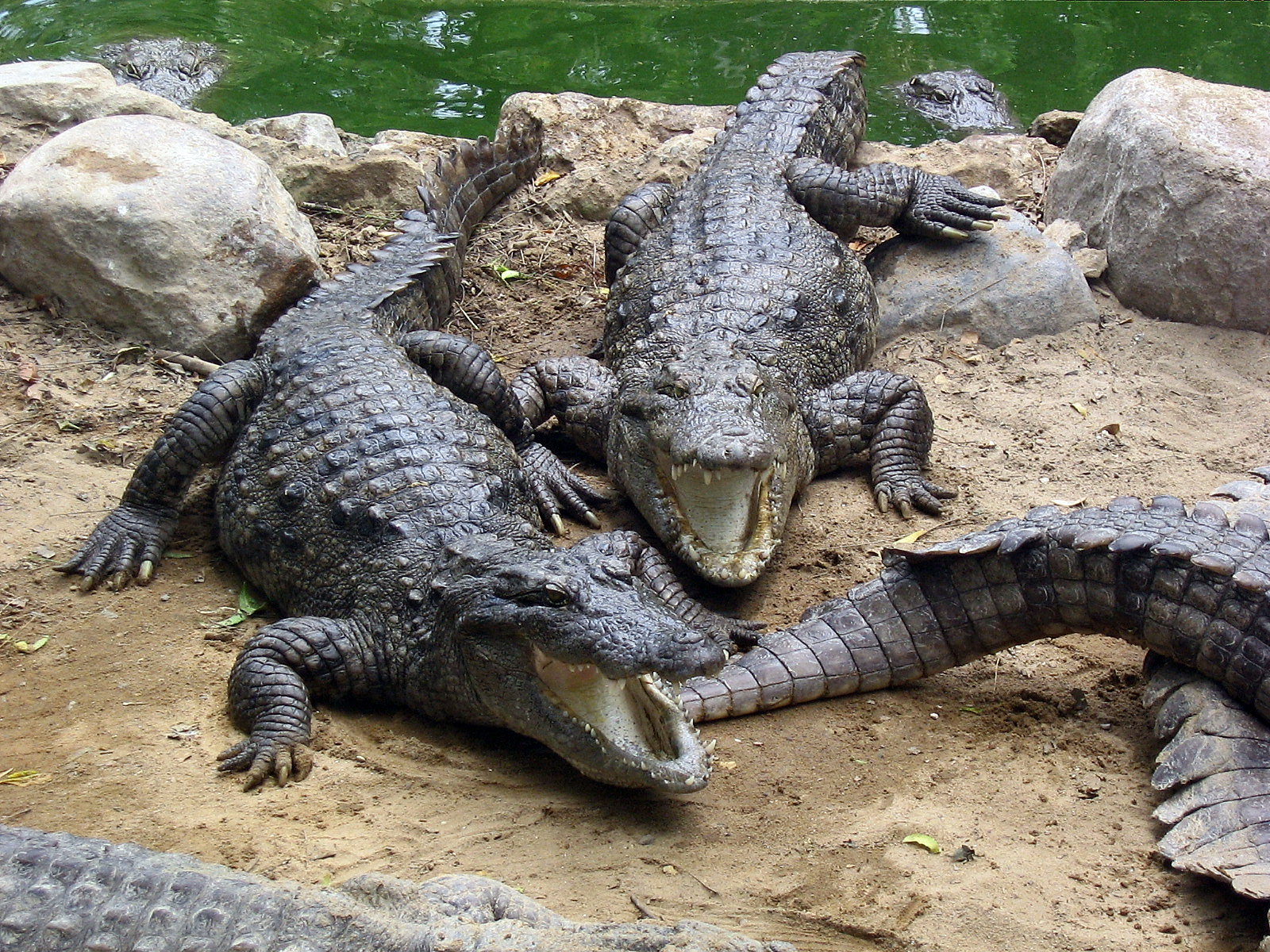
Mugger crocodile
Crocodylus palustris

=== Beaches ===
The Gokarna main beach is in town and Kudle beach faces west. Om beach, Half moon Beach, Paradise Beach (also known as Full moon) and Belekan beach are south facing. Nearby areas like Honnavar is famous for backwater boating as well as mangrove boardwalk and Karwar for watersports and adventures.

=== Lifeguards and security measures ===
Community locals have demanded rescue measures and extra security after lifeguards rescued seven people including two foreign tourists have been rescued from drowning on Gokarna beach. The police have installed CCTV cameras and mics in all the beaches of Gokarna.

=== Healthcare ===
Healthcare services in Gokarna are generally available for a small pilgrimage and coastal town, but are primarily limited to basic medical care. The town has a government-run Primary Health Centre (PHC), basic emergency services, ambulance services and Ayurveda facilities.

The nearest reliable medical facility for the initial treatment of snakebites, including immediate access to snake antivenom (ASV), is the government-run General Hospital (Baggon Government Hospital) in Kumta, located approximately 25 km from Gokarna. Following initial antivenom treatment, patients are typically transferred to the snakebite-specialised Kasturba Hospital in Manipal for further care.

Patients requiring major surgery, intensive care, cardiac, neurological or trauma treatment, or advanced diagnostic procedures are usually transferred to hospitals in Karwar, Udupi, Mangalore, or in some cases to private hospitals in the neighbouring state of Goa. In serious medical emergencies, rapid transfer by locally based ambulance services is considered essential. Due to the winding road infrastructure, transport to hospitals located up to 250 km away may take several hours. For planned medical procedures, many travellers therefore prefer larger medical centres such as those in Manipal or Mangalore. .

== Education ==
Bhadrakali High School in Melinkeli was founded in 1946. A notable alumnus of the school is cancer research scientist, Narayan Sadashiv Hosmane.

== See also ==
- Bhookailasa (1940 film)
- Murudeshwara
- Apsarakonda
- Karwar
- Mangalore
- Om Parvat
