= Nador (caste) =

Nador (Nadavaru)
- ನಾಡವರು
- Religions: Jainism; Hinduism
- Languages: Nadavara Kannada, a dialect of Kannada
- Region: India

Nador (ನಾಡೋರ) or Nadavaru (Kannada: ನಾಡವರು) or Nadavar (ನಾಡವರ) is the name of a caste from Karnataka, India. Members of the castle are found primarily in the coastal areas of Uttara Kannada district, formerly known as North Canara, with many members also spread throughout the world. Caste members traditionally speak the Nadavar dialect of Kannada called Nadavar Kannada (ನಾಡವರ ಕನ್ನಡ). They are a prominent agriculture community of the Uttara Kannada district of Karnataka, India.

== Etymology and origins ==
Nador means the people of Nadu or Country. The Nador are believed to have converted to Hinduism from Jainism between the 16th and 18th centuries. Nador speak Nadavar Kannada (ನಾಡವರ ಕನ್ನಡ). which is a form of Kannada that has significant phonological variations from other Kannada dialects. Prominent surnames are Nayak, Gaonkar, Naik. Rarer surnames include Kavari, Patil, Mirashi and so on.

== History ==
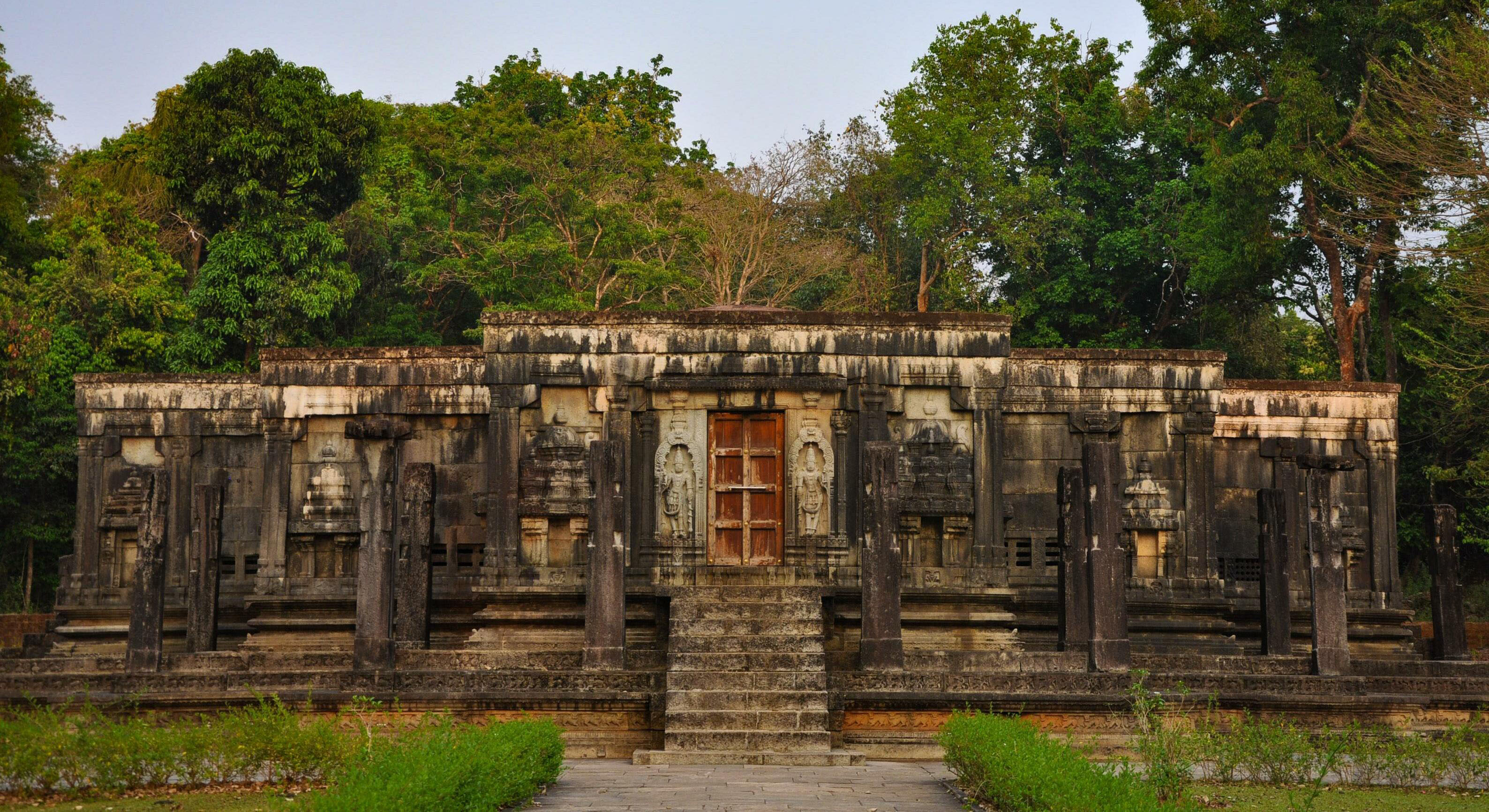
Chaturmukha Basadi, Gerusoppa constructed during the reign of Chennabhairadevi

Historically, the Uttara Kannada district was known as Ankola Province before the period of British rule. A Sheila Inscription in the village of Bhavikeri, Ankola was inscribed in the period of the Vijayanagara Empire under King Bukkarayana (period of 1362 AD). Nador people were trained as cavalry in this region. During this period the Portuguese invaded the coastal belt and were successfully confronted by Queen Chennabhairadevi of Gerusoppe. Nadavaru joined her as soldiers, and for their loyalty, Channabhairadevi made the Nadavaru the highest military leaders in the Gerusoppe Empire Army.

Queen Chennabhairadevi and Nadavaru''' / '''Nadava''' / '''Nador'''. The Uttara Kannada district was known as Ankola Province before the British rule. Sheila Inscription in the village of Bhavikeri, Ankola was inscribed in the Vijayanagara Empire King Bukkarayana period of 1362 AD, which is said to be the Ankola Nadu region, which was a Vijayanagara period. Nadavaru trained cavalry in Ankola's Jamagod. He was an Army Commander of the Nadavara Community in the Karnataka Coastal Region Vijayanagar Empire Cavalry. After the fall of the Vijayanagara Empire from the war of 1565, the fort of Ankola was ruled by the Jain Queen of Gerusopa. During this period the Portuguese invaded the coastal belt and were successfully confronted by Queen Chennabhairadevi of Gerusoppe. After the fall of Vijayanagara, Jain queen Channabhairadevi, Nadavaru originally belonged to the Jain community.

The Nadavara transition from Jainism to Hinduism lasted for hundred and fifty years, starting from the seventeenth century. During this period the community was split between Hindu and Jain religions.

Nadavars were feudal soldiers during the rule of Vijayanagara, Keladi Nayakas and Bidanur kings. They traditionally kept peace in their regions. The Portuguese, who originally came as traders to India, found looting of ports a cheaper way of obtaining goods and also were said to engage in browbeating port traders into trading only with them. In the early eighteenth century, Portuguese fleets repeatedly attacked and damaged various coastal towns of Basrur, Barkur, Honnavara, Kumta, Gokarna, Mirjan and Torke near Kumta. The fleets caused extensive damage to the properties and looted. The Mahabaleshwar Temple, Gokarna was also said to have been damaged. To resist the Portuguese soldiers, the clans of the Nador caste were made to settle around Gokarna and all riverine entry points like, Gangavali, Mirjan, Chandavar, Baad, etc. As well as soldiers, members of the castle were also farmers.

As per the 1883 Kanara gazette, "both men and women were tall and strong", and most of them were well featured. Many own a large area of land. Some were village headmen and moneylenders. They are now mainly found in the coastal taluks of Karwar, Ankola, Kumta and other parts of Uttara kannada. The Nador community is the dominant one in the Ankola and Gokarna regions. The literacy rate of the Nadavar community is 99%. They are a highly developed and socialised community in their region and their population is less than one lakh.

== Nadavars as landowners ==
Until the first half of the twentieth century, Nador were mainly landowners and farmers. Nador lived in joint families and their income was from farmlands and temples. At the end of the nineteenth century, the Tenancy Act and the Land Activation Act were proposed, with an objective to improve the relations between Jamindars (Landlords) and Raiyatas (Farmers). The British Colonial Rule raised the taxes on land and lowered the land rent. A separate agricultural department was created by Viceroy Lord George Curzon to oversee the successful implementation of the new land tax law. Many Nador landlords could not collect enough land rent to pay the taxes and lost most of their lands. Some still possessed enough land to live quite comfortably but had to curtail their expenses. For the non-payment of taxes on land, they lost most of the remaining little pieces of land that they inherited from their fathers and some lost even their homes. A group of local merchants, just by paying the pending or unpaid taxes, purchased lands lost by the Nador caste for incredibly low prices. In Karnataka, Nador were the major sufferers during the period of the Non-tax Payment Movement.

== Contributions to the independence of India ==
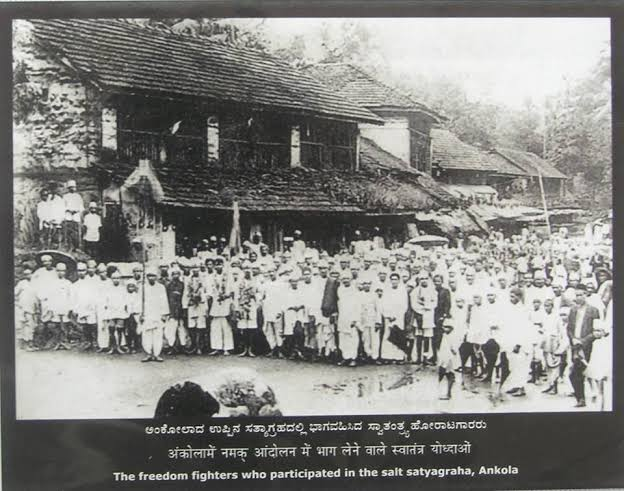
Nadavara Community in salt Satyagraha

Even though the Nadavar community is small in size, its contribution to the independence of India is important. During the Salt Satyagraha (non-tax payment movement) from 1930 to 1934, the Nador peacefully participated in Mohandas K. Gandhi's Ahimsa (non-violence) revolt. It was a long-awaited opportunity for them to oppose the British rule. Many Nador men were imprisoned up to six years near New Delhi. Many villages such as Soorve, Shetageri were participated in the freedom struggle in huge numbers and in November 1942, the entire Nador community, including many women, participated in the Quit India Movement (non-violence freedom movement) headed by Mahatma Gandhi. The evidence of the community members participating in these events is even referred in the palace of Mysore Maharajas (wodeyars). Nadavara Community strongly involved in independent India movements. Famous Kannada poet, author Dr.Dinakara Desai himself praise their brave character and wrote "Nadavare nija nadigaru" ನಾಡವರೇ ನಿಜ ನಾಡಿಗರು ನೋಡು ಕಾಳಗವ ಹೂಡಿಹರು ||ಪಲ್ಲ || ಸ್ವಾತಂತ್ರ್ಯದ ಸುಖದೂಟವನುಂಡು ವಿಜಯನಗರದಲಿ ಕಾದಿದ ದಂಡು ನಾಡವರಿಂದಿನ ದಾಸ್ಯವ ಕಂಡು | ಉಪ್ಪು ಮಾಡುವರು ಮುಂದಕೆ ಬಂದು | ಹಿಂದಿನ ಹುರುಪೇ ಇಂದಿಗೆ ಮೂಡಿ | ನಾಡವರೆಲ್ಲರೂ ಒಂದೆಡೆಗೂಡಿ | ಗಾಂಧಿ ಮಹಾತ್ಮಾರ ಕೊಂಬಿನು ಕೇಳಿ | ನೆಗೆದು ಕಾದುವರು ದೈರ್ಯವ ತಾಳಿ | ನಾಡವರೇ ನಿಜ ನಾಡಿಗರು.

== Religion ==
One can find Golibeera, Jain beera, Jain Jataka, and Jain temples in Nadava villages.

=== Jainism ===
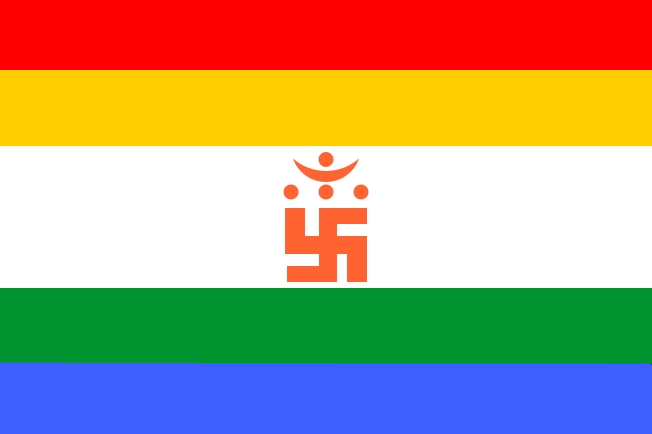
Nadavara community were historically followers of Jainism

Nadavars originally belonged to the Jain Community, who worshipped Jainism. There are Jain temples and Jain wells in the villages where the Nadavars live. Numerous Jain articles and other articles still testify that Nadavars belonged to the Jain community.

Nadavara transition from Jainism to Hinduism lasted for hundred and fifty years, starting from the seventeenth century. During this period the community was split between Hindu and Jain religions.

The process of changing from one religious conviction to the other might have caused some anxiety and disorganization. In the early 1800s still there were about 65% of the Nadavara families following the Jainism. The religious divide didn't outwardly disturb the community and still remained as one integral entity. Nuptials among the two religious wings of the community were as usual. The main difference was their food habit. Initially in Konkan the Nadavaras converted to Hindu faith relished on fish and it took many years before they started eating chicken and mutton. The Jain - Nadavaras were still vegetarians and when they visited their Hindu relatives, obviously vegetarian food was prepared. In the early nineteenth century, a few families in Torke were still vegetarians.

=== Hinduism ===
Om, a prominent Hindu symbol

Nadavars are now primarily Vaishnavas (Devotees of the God Vishnu) and worship Lord Venkataramana Tirumala – Tirupati.

They played major roles in the religious functions of both Shiva and Vishnu temples until the early part of twentieth century. Nador are Muktheshwaras (respected members) of many temples, including Mahabaleshwar Temple, Gokarna and Venkataramana of Ankola. Between the 17th and 19th centuries for many Nadavara families, temples were sources of income. They shared the revenues generated by the local temples. Most Nador idolize their own fallen family heroes (Beera) and women of virtue (Sati) whom they worship on special occasions. Beera Shrines and Sati stones are common scenes in most Nadavara villages. Deepavali (Festival of Lights) is the most important festival for the Nador caste. The festivity is observed for three days as the celebration of Lord Krishna's victory over Narakasura.

Many Nadavara homes have miniature temples of Lord Venkateshwara and Tulsi. The family temple was solely intended for the family's private services. The temple architecture was a hybrid drawn from the blend of northern and southern Indian styles. The proportions of the temple were rigidly standardized. It was constructed on a three-foot-high by ten-foot-square foundation. Four ornate six-foot-tall pillars were erected from the four corners that supported the tiled roof. The temple did not have walls because of the warm climatic conditions. A carved stone statue of the God Vishnu and petite sandalwood sculptures representing their ancestors who died in the wars were kept in the centre of the temple. The family temple led to the decentralization of the Nadavara religious activities. The family temple played an important role in preserving the family integrity and harmony but isolated them from the other communities.

== Culture and traditions ==
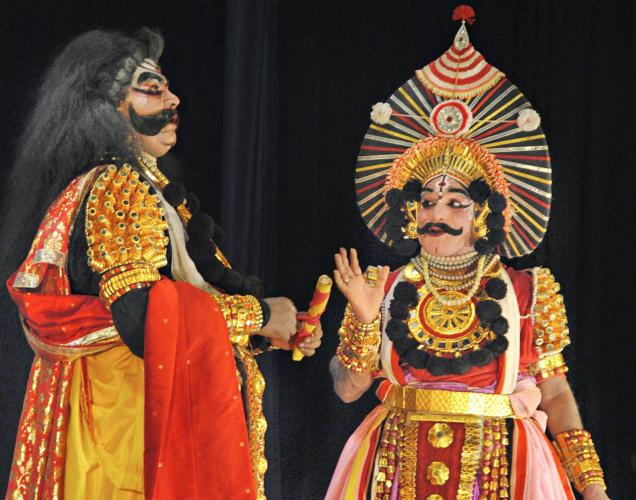
Yakshagana

=== Festivals ===
==== Ugadi / Yugadi (ಯುಗಾದಿ) ====
The name Yugadi or Ugadi is derived from the Sanskrit words Yuga (age) and ādi (beginning) i.e. 'The beginning of a new age'. Yugadi or Ugadi falls on 'Chaitra Shudhdha Paadyami' or the first day of the bright half of the Indian month of Chaitra. This generally falls in late March or early April of the Gregorian calendar. It is the New Year's Day for the Nador community.

The day is observed by drawing colourful geometric patterns on floor in front of the house called Rangoli (ರಂಗೋಲಿ), mango leaf decorations on doors called Torana (Kannada: ತೋರಣ), buying and giving gifts such as new clothes, giving charity to the poor, special bath followed by oil treatment, preparing and sharing a special food and visiting Hindu temples. In Hindu traditions, it is a symbolic reminder that one must expect all flavors of experiences in the coming new year and make the most of them.

==== Makara Sankranti (ಮಕರ ಸಂಕ್ರಾಂತಿ) ====
Makar Sankranti is the Suggi (ಸುಗ್ಗಿ) or harvest festival for farmers. On this day, girls wear new clothes to visit close friends and family with a Sankranti offering on a plate and exchange the same with other families. This ritual is called "Ellu Birodhu". Here the plate would normally contain "Ellu" (white sesame seeds) mixed with fried groundnuts, neatly cut dry coconut and fine cut Jaggery (bella). The mixture is called "Ellu-Bella" (ಎಳ್ಳು ಬೆಲ್ಲ). The plate contains shaped sugar candy moulds (ಸಕ್ಕರೆ ಅಚ್ಚು [Sakkare Acchu]) with a piece of sugarcane. This festival signifies the harvest of the season, since sugarcane is also predominant in these parts. Small gift items useful in everyday lives are often exchanged among women.

==== Bandi Habba (ಬಂಡಿ ಹಬ್ಬ) ====
In May, in the Coastal Bandi habba Uttara Kannada District 'Bandi Habba', a folk festival occurs. It is a festival for farmers to evoke the blessings of village deities before sowing. It is also celebrated in honour of those killed in wars and "Mahasatis" who sacrificed their lives to uphold the village tradition. It is called "Bandi Habba" because in ancient days the deities were placed on a Bandi (ಬಂಡಿ) (a cart with four wheels) and taken in a procession.

The presiding deity of the festival is the gram devate Ammanavaru also known as Shanta Durga, Bhoomitai and Kanchika Parameshwari. The festival is celebrated for 2 to 12 days. This is the biggest festival where the entire community come together. During the festival, "Kalasaa" (ಕಳಸಾ), a small pot filled with rice grains is kept on a stone platform in the temple. The "Kalasaa" is decorated with flowers and ornaments and the mask of the deity is placed at the centre of the platform. Every day during the festival, Gunaga, the head priest, carries the "Kalasaa" on his head and goes in a procession. At night, the "Kalasaa" is placed on a platform called "Adukatte" and worshiped. "Hagarana", a folk dance, is the main attraction of the festival. "Hagarana" is then performed before the deity. After "Hagarana", the "Kalasaa" is taken to "Uyyale Chappara," a swing. The gunaga conducts the traditional rituals there. The festival brings people of different communities together. The festival can be a tourist attraction and provide opportunities to study the folk art, culture and tradition of the region.

==== Nool habba (ನೂಲ ಹಬ್ಬ) ====
This festival is observed by all members of the family by wearing a sacred thread which is said to be purified by the blessings of God. During the festival, all family members enjoy a vegetarian lunch together, eaten on a banana plantain.

==== Nagar Panchami (ನಾಗರ ಪಂಚಮಿ) ====
A special pooja is performed for "Snake God Nagraj". Their scriptures mention that they are descendants of the snake and they prepare a special food known as "Sooli Rutti". Grated coconut is mixed in hot jaggary along with cardamom and a sticky paste is prepared. It is placed in rice floor dough and steamed in a turmeric leaf.

==== Dodda Habba (Deepawali) ====
Deepavali (Festival of Lights) is the most important festival for the Nador caste. The festivity is observed for three days as the celebration of Lord Krishna's victory over Narakasura and day called as Narak Chaturdashi followed by Amavaasyya (No moon day) and Bali Padyami. The evening before Narak Chaturdashi fresh water is taken from a well and put in big copper pots which are cleaned and decorated. On Narak Chaturdashi day, family members gets a coconut oil and turmeric paste massage from head to toe and drink bitter traditional syrup. After bathing, new clothes are worn and their family deity is worshiped. A special breakfast is made from beaten rice. On the second day, Amavaasyya (No moon day) is celebrated by performing Lakshmi Pooja. On the third day of Bali Paadyami, they install Lord Balindra (Bali Chakravarthi), a statue made by clay which is then worshiped.

==== Tulsi Habba (ತುಳಸಿ ಹಬ್ಬ) ====
Most Nadavara homes have a tulsi plant. On one day a year, a special puja is performed. The tulsi is decorated with sugarcane, amala fruit branches, tamarind fruit branches, and lots of flowers. This is an important festival for the Nador caste and is often connected with marriages.

=== Food ===
The Nador community holds large area of cultivating land. Primarily, these communities grow rice but also cultivate cash crops, such as sugarcane, watermelon, groundnut, urad dal, etc. Some Nador farms have plantations of coconut, mango, beetle nut, pepper, and cashew. Other Nador farms may specialize in fisheries and prawn cultivation.

Nador traditional food includes "Ganji", which is prepared by boiled rice with lots of water. Another is "Hulga", which is a form of sambar that is prepared by with coconut milk and added with lots of vegetables, typically grown in backyard. Others include "Kuchgakki Anna" – Boiled rice meal, "Shitlin Paladi" – Prawn gravy, and "Hacchad Meen" – Fish dipped in coconut chetny with lots of tamarind and spicy. "Hanchi Rutti" is an Indian bread prepared by rice flour and cooked on an earthen pan, dried in fire. Nador curry dishes include, "Koli Aasi"- Chicken Curry, "Onaa Meen Saar"- Dried Fish Curry, "Shitlin Pudi"-Prawn dry dish, "Koli Sukka"– dry chicken.

=== Customs ===
==== Pregnancy ====
Seemantha (Baby Shower) is a tradition which celebrates a woman's transition to motherhood. On the day of ‘seemantha’, Nador women circle around the sacred 'tulasi katte' several times and lighti the lamp (deepa), praying for good fortune. The mother in law presents a saree, gold, 5 beetle leaves/nuts to the mothers and the relatives of the girl are to reciprocate by decorating the young mother with 5 different types of flowers, food, gifts, jewellery, etc. During the ceremony, the bride is fed with an array of choice dishes including 15 types of sweets. The pregnant woman leaves for her home after obtaining the consent of her mother-in-law.

==== Labour and birth ====
When a Nadavara woman begins expressing labour pains, the mid-wives surrounding the mother signal the arrival of the new- born baby by beating plates. As soon as the baby is delivered, the umbilical cord is cut and buried usually in the backyard. After the birth, sugar and banana are distributed to close relatives.

==== Cleaning rituals ====
Five days after the birth of the baby, the cleaning ritual begins. This is a ritualistic process of purification of both mother and baby. The entire house is traditionally cleansed with cow-dung mixed with water and the 'sacred water' (theertha) obtained from the temple, is sprinkled in different directions of the house. On this occasion the naming of the baby takes place. On the 16th day the baby is ceremoniously placed in the cradle.

==== Cradle ceremony ====
On the day of placing the baby in the cradle, the elderly women in the family come together and sing folk-lullaby songs, in turns. While other women start distributing beaten rice, the relatives place money in the hands of baby. In order to protect the baby from evil, cow dung is placed in the area which is parallel to the direction, where the child's head rests, in the cradle. For 40 days, the mother is not allowed to perform any difficult work. Meanwhile, the mother is allowed to go along with an escort if she needs to venture outside the house. On the 40th day, the mother mixes turmeric powder with water and has a 'sacred bath' for the final act of cleansing. After her bath, she decks herself with a new silk sari and jewellery and, in a ceremonial function, draws water from a well. After pouring 1/4th of the water at the 'tulasi katte', the rest of the water is used to wash her legs. Later she goes to a local temple, accompanied by friends and relatives. On this day a special feast with array of dishes is prepared. From this day onwards, the mother takes part in all house hold activities and does not confine herself to bed. During this ceremony, the mother, along with her new born baby, pays a visit to her husband's house. In the absence of the mother and the child, the cradle should not be removed.

==== Chowla and ear piercing ====
This ceremony celebrates a child coming of age. It is observed by removing the hair on the scalp. This ceremony is not observed for all male children but only for the first male member of the family. On a predetermined day, the barber after symbolically obtaining permission from the elders of the family, removes hair from the cheek and cuts handful of hair. Later the child is given a bath and brought inside the home. After the bath the child is made to sit on the lap of his Maternal Uncle. The ear lobes are pierced and the ear ring made by the goldsmith will decorate the ears of the child. After the symbolic distribution of sweets, a sumptuous feast will follow.

==== Akshrabhyasa ====
The Nador caste believe that education is an important aspect of life. As such, every child is expected to go through with an akshrabhyasa ritual. This is where a child is given the first lessons of their education. Parents hold the hand of the child with s turmeric piece and letters are written on a rice filled plate.

==== Marriage ====
A hundred years ago, Nador wedding customs were quite distinct. The marriage celebration lasted for five days. For the first three days, both the wedding parties carried out homa at their dwellings separately. The purpose of Homa was to strengthen the bonds of alliance and camaraderie among relatives and friends. During those days for warriors, it was difficult to survive without unity. The wedding ceremony, which was on the fourth day lasted for the entire day and part of the night. The bride and groom were the focal point of the wedding. Professionally trained, eight palanquin bearers carried the groom wearing, a saffron or red turban, to the wedding in a specially decorated palanquin. The groom's wedding party procession consisted of friends and families along with a carpenter, blacksmith, potter, barber, goldsmith and washer-man. His brothers and cousins who were the assigned bodyguards for the occasion surrounded the groom. Porters carrying fruits and clothes in bamboo baskets and Vajantris (live musical bands) stayed ahead of the procession. The bride wore a red sari embroidered in gold and silver threads. The priest performed the wedding ceremony in front of the bride's family temple.

The priest. after the garland exchange ritual. held a meeting in the family temple with the parents to bridge the differences, if any between the two parties. The evening was dedicated to entertainment. Fifty years ago, marrying within the caste was the norm and marrying outside was quite rare. Lately inter-caste marriages have become more frequent.

==== Huvu Mudisuvudu (Engagement ceremony) ====
The relatives of a man who has attained marriageable age broach the subject of the marriage with a family who have an eligible daughter. When the first round of talk succeeds, the engagement ceremony is fixed on an auspicious day. The relatives of the 'eligible' daughter on a specific day proceed to the would-be-bridegrooms house and ratify the date of engagement. The third round of talks commence, when on the day of engagement, the would-be-grooms’ relatives along with the elderly villager visit the would-be-bride's house. This is ceremony is mainly attended by women members from grooms’ family. They carry many variety of flowers, sweets, gifts, jewellery and a silk saari. The groom's sister performs all rituals. The marriage is decided, and the marriage date is fixed by both family elders. Later they exchange 'Thambula' (consisting of beetle leaf and beetle nuts) and pledge not to 'disturb the alliance'.

==== Javali Taruvudu (New clothing) ====
Bride and Grooms’ family buy new clothes for family members. These new clothes will be presented to the family members as a kind gesture. Bride and Grooms’ buy traditional clothes for the occasion, however, in recent years, other clothes are increasingly worn. Also, on this day the Bride and Grooms’ brother-in-law buys a new umbrella, baasinga and auspicious coconut.

==== Maduveya Chappara ====
Since the marriage takes place in the homes of bride's family or bride groom's family, a 'chappara' (a raised platform covered with dried palm leaves) is constructed before the house. Later, a 'Muhurtada Kamba' will be planted. Several leaves of the mango tree are stringed together and feathered at the entrance of the house. Finally, the wedding platform complete with a 'Mantap' is built. In recent times, the marriage takes place in marriage halls which is mutually agreed. Typically, the bride's family takes care of the entire proceedings.

===== Kshwora, Arasina Hachhudu, Abyanga Snaana =====
In this instance, the groom gets his hair cut and shaving done in a symbolic ritual by the family barber.

All women members of bride's and groom's families apply Arashina (turmeric paste) to them followed by coconut oil. They take turns pouring water and giving baths to them. This entire ritual is conducted in the portico or near a coconut tree which is decorated with mango leaves and atti leaves tied with bamboo sticks and placed in an arch form.

==== Dibbana and Dhare Yereyuvudu (Marriage procession and ceremony) ====
The tradition of bringing invitees in a group to the place of marriage ceremony is called 'dibbana baruvudu'. Before proceeding, the head of the family accompanied by elders will offer prayers to their family deity. The procession is accompanied by the loud beating of drums and trumpets (sometimes crackers are also burst) while proceeding to the wedding hall. The relatives of the bride welcome the procession by offering water to wash their feet. Later in an intimate gesture bride's side lead the members into the hall. Before entering the hall, the feet of the bride groom are washed with the turmeric water. Meanwhile, as the 'aarthi' is being lifted a group of women sing 'shobana'. Later the bride steps into the hall by placing her right leg first inside the hall. All invitees are seated in their places, and are provided with juice.

After that 'Muhurtha shesha', the ceremony will be followed. During this ceremony, any one from the bride's side carries a 'kanchina gindi', filled in the mouth with fresh nodes mango and jackfruit tree with a coconut and account palm inflorescence. The elderly member takes it to each member of the audience where everybody touches it and bless the couple. The 'gurikar' next announces 'Dhare yereyutheve' three times before placing the girls hand and grooms hand. After the dhare ceremony the bride and groom take their place. This time the bride sits on the left side of the bride groom.

The young couple, who are accompanied by the traditional beating of drums and trumpets, walk away from the wedding hall up to some distance and return with blessings of all invitees. The small procession of cousins and relatives accompanies the couple. They are accorded a traditional welcome by pouring water on their feet. Later the newly married couple prostrate before each elder from both families and obtain their blessings.

==== Death customs ====
On confirmation of death, the body will be shifted to the front portico of the house. After laying the body on the ground, a fistful of rice is placed near the head and the fistful of paddy is placed near the legs. A coconut broken into equal halves will be placed on the rice and paddy heap. After filling up these shells with oil, a wick is placed and lighted. Care is taken to ensure that the wick keeps burning until the body is shifted. Incense sticks are, after being ignited should be stuck on the stem of the cut banana plant. Family members should keep a watch over the body until all the near and dear ones assemble.

As the pyre is being readied, turmeric powder mixed with oil is applied on the body and later cleansed in warm water. If the deceased is a male person, close male relatives will perform the task and vice versa. Later the corpse is wrapped in a piece of cloth and brought inside the house. The corpse will be decorated by wrapping a turban, if the corpse is male and vermillon will be applied on the fore head, if the corpse is female. A garland made of 'tulasi leaves' is placed on the corpse. The body is then shifted on to a single plantain leaf and moved in such a position that the head rests in the south direction. Close relatives and prominent personalities in the village place sheets of clothes on the corpse. In recent times, sandal wood and flower wreaths placed on the body. Then the funeral pyre is built by adding logs of mango tree wood. Historically, the locals used to reserve a field exclusively meant for burning dead people. After woman sprinkling tulasi water into the corpse's mouth, the body is shifted on to a bamboo stretcher. Carried by sons or near relatives, the carrying of the stretcher to the funeral pyre is often accompanied by the chanting of 'govinda govinda'. The stretcher bearers circle the pyre anticlockwise direction and shift the body on the pyre. The body is positioned such that the head faces southern side. Additional fire wood is stocked such that it covers the corpse fully. Usually the eldest son lights the pyre near the corpse's feet direction. As the pyre turns into full blaze the knife, axes used in cutting the wood is thrown over the pyre from West to East. The remaining items like rice, paddy, coconut shells, incense sticks, plantain leaf, etc. is bundled together and thrown to the flames.

After that each family member takes a cold bath and enter the house. The entire house is swept and cleaned. Before feeding on a frugal lunch consisting of porridge (ganji) and chutney, family members decide on the date of appearing the spirits rituals.

The third day after the body is burnt, the family observe "boodhi tigeyud’ and on 12th day "uttar kriya"("bojja") is observed. On the third day, the ash is piled in the shape of a mountain and a tulasi plant is planted. The skeletal remains should be collected in a small pot and tied to a branch. After the "uttar kriya"("bojja") the skeletal remains should be dispersed in a holy river. After this ritual, relatives as a sign of mourning shave off their beards and moustache. After "boodhi tigeyud" ritual the heir fills a bowl with water drawn from the well and keeps it adjacent to a lighted wick lamp. The water has to be changed twice a day on mornings and evenings. Till the 13th day, all inmates must have a head bath, abstain from meat-eating and should remain indoors. On the 12th day, after the death of a person "uttar kriya" ("bojja") is observed. After the completion of several rituals, the guests are invited to a sumptuous lunch. Before the lunch all the prepared dishes are put in a plantain leaf and placed at a little distance from the house for the crows to feast upon. After a crow touches the food, the serving of food to the guests begins. On 14th day, a sumptuous dinner with tasteful meat and fish dishes are prepared.

==== Hobbies and folk games ====
A popular folk dance in Ankola is Yakshagana. Yakshagana (ಯಕ್ಷಗಾನ) is a traditional theatre form that combines dance, music, dialogue, costume, make-up, and stage techniques with a unique style and form. This theatre style is mainly found in coastal regions of Karnataka and Kerala. Yakshagana is traditionally presented from dusk to dawn. Its stories are drawn from Ramayana, Mahabharata, Bhagavata and other Hindu epics.
