= List of highways numbered 141 =

The following highways are numbered 141:

== Canada ==
- Ontario Highway 141
- Prince Edward Island Route 141
- Quebec Route 141

== Costa Rica ==
- National Route 141

== India ==
- National Highway 141 (India)

== Japan ==
- Japan National Route 141
- Fukuoka Prefectural Route 141
- Nara Prefectural Route 141

== Malaysia ==
- Malaysia Federal Route 141

== United Kingdom ==
- A141 road

== United States ==
- U.S. Route 141
- Alabama State Route 141
- Arkansas Highway 141
- California State Route 141 (former)
- Colorado State Highway 141
- Delaware Route 141
- Florida State Road 141 (former)
  - County Road 141 (Hamilton County, Florida)
  - County Road 141 (Madison County, Florida)
- Georgia State Route 141
- Illinois Route 141
- Indiana State Road 141 (former)
- Iowa Highway 141
- K-141 (Kansas highway)
- Kentucky Route 141
- Louisiana Highway 141
- Maine State Route 141
- Massachusetts Route 141
- Missouri Route 141
- Montana Highway 141
- New Hampshire Route 141
- New York State Route 141
  - County Route 141 (Erie County, New York)
  - County Route 141 (Herkimer County, New York)
  - County Route 141 (Niagara County, New York)
  - County Route 141 (Rensselaer County, New York)
  - County Route 141 (Sullivan County, New York)
- North Carolina Highway 141
- Ohio State Route 141
- Oklahoma State Highway 141
- Oregon Route 141
- Pennsylvania Route 141 (former)
- Tennessee State Route 141
- Texas State Highway 141
  - Texas State Highway Loop 141 (former)
  - Farm to Market Road 141
- Utah State Route 141
  - Utah State Route 141 (1933-1969) (former)
- Vermont Route 141
- Virginia State Route 141
  - Virginia State Route 141 (pre-1933) (former)
  - Virginia State Route 141 (1923-1928) (former)
  - Virginia State Route 141 (1933-1943) (former)
  - Virginia State Route 141Y (former)
- Washington State Route 141
- Wisconsin Highway 141 (pre-1926) (former)

Territories

- Puerto Rico Highway 141

Preceded by 140	Lists of highways 141	Succeeded by 142
