= Massachusetts Route 142 =

State highway in Franklin County, Massachusetts, US

Route 142
- Route 142 highlighted in red

Route information
- Maintained by MassDOT
- Length: 3.99 mi (6.42 km)
- Existed: by 1975–present

Major junctions
- South end: Route 10 in Bernardston
- North end: VT 142 at the Vermont state line near Northfield

Location
- Country: United States
- State: Massachusetts
- Counties: Franklin

Highway system
- Massachusetts State Highway System; Interstate; US; State
← Route 141	→ Route 143

Route 142 is a 3.99-mile-long (6.42 km) south–north state highway in western Massachusetts. From its southern terminus at Route 10 in Bernardston, Route 142 runs north through Bernardston and Gill in the first 0.10-mile (0.16 km). Then it proceeds through the portion of Northfield west of the Connecticut River before crossing the Vermont state line, where it continues as VT 142.

== Route description ==
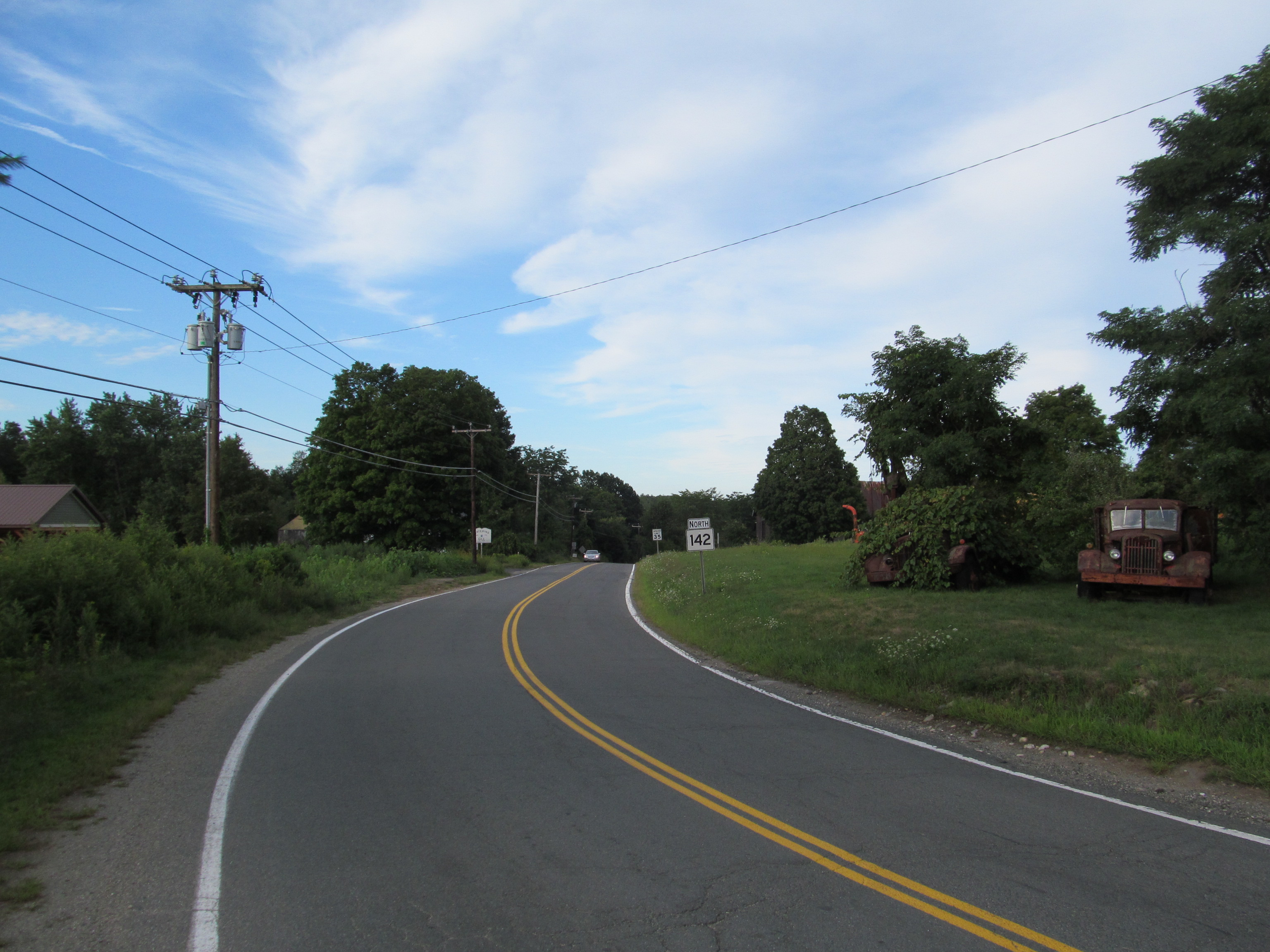
Route 142 northbound entering Gill

Route 142 begins at an intersection with Route 10 in the town of Bernardston, a bit northeast of downtown. Route 142 proceeds north through Bernardston as Mount Hermon Station Road, crossing into the town of Gill and the community of Mount Hermon Station after crossing nearby railroad tracks. The route parallels the tracks for a short distance, soon turning north and passing Lower Pond. On the other side of Old Vernon Road, Route 142 passes east of Upper Pond, crossing directly through the center of a nearby quarry in Northfield.

After the quarry, Route 142 turns north again, paralleling the railroad tracks and further east, the Connecticut River. The two-lane road crosses past a number of residences, soon reaching a junction with Garrish Road, where it makes a sudden turn to the northwest. Almost immediately after the turn, Route 142 reaches the Vermont state line, becoming VT 142 (Fort Bridgman Road) on the opposite side towards downtown Vernon, Vermont.

== Major intersections ==
The entire route is in Franklin County.

Location	mi	km	Destinations	Notes
Bernardston	0.00	0.00	Route 10 – Northfield, Keene, NH, Bernardston	Southern terminus
Northfield	3.99	6.42	VT 142 north (Fort Bridgman Road) – Vernon, Brattleboro	Continuation into Vermont
1.000 mi = 1.609 km; 1.000 km = 0.621 mi
