= Aghanashini =

Aghanashini may refer to:

- Aghanashini (village), in Karnataka, India
- Aghanashini River, also in Karnataka
