= List of highways numbered 138 =

Highway 138 may refer to:

== Canada ==
- Ontario Highway 138
- Prince Edward Island Route 138
- Quebec Route 138

== Costa Rica ==
- National Route 138

== India ==
- National Highway 138 (India)

== Japan ==
- Japan National Route 138
- Fukuoka Prefectural Route 138
- Nara Prefectural Route 138

== Malaysia ==
- Malaysia Federal Route 138

== United Kingdom ==
- A138 road
- B138 road

== United States ==
- U.S. Route 138
- Alabama State Route 138
  - County Route 138 (Lee County, Alabama)
- Arkansas Highway 138
- California State Route 138
- Connecticut Route 138
- Florida State Road 138 (former)
  - County Road 138 (Columbia County, Florida)
  - County Road 138 (Gilchrist County, Florida)
  - County Road 138A (Lafayette County, Florida)
  - County Road 138 (Pinellas County, Florida)
- Georgia State Route 138
- Hawaii Route 138
- Illinois Route 138
- K-138 (Kansas highway)
- Kentucky Route 138
- Louisiana Highway 138
- Maine State Route 138
- Maryland Route 138
- Massachusetts Route 138
- M-138 (Michigan highway)
- Missouri Route 138
- New Jersey Route 138
- New Mexico State Road 138
- New York State Route 138
  - County Route 138 (Herkimer County, New York)
  - County Route 138 (Niagara County, New York)
  - County Route 138 (Onondaga County, New York)
- North Carolina Highway 138
- Ohio State Route 138
- Oregon Route 138
- Pennsylvania Route 138
- Rhode Island Route 138
  - Rhode Island Route 138A
- Tennessee State Route 138
- Texas State Highway 138
  - Texas State Highway Spur 138
  - Farm to Market Road 138
- Utah State Route 138
  - Utah State Route 138 (1933-1953) (former)
- Virginia State Route 138
  - Virginia State Route 138 (1930-1933) (former)
- Wisconsin Highway 138
- Wyoming Highway 138 (former)

Territories

- Puerto Rico Highway 138

Preceded by 137	Lists of highways 138	Succeeded by 139
