= Vibhuthi Falls =

Waterfall in Karnataka, India

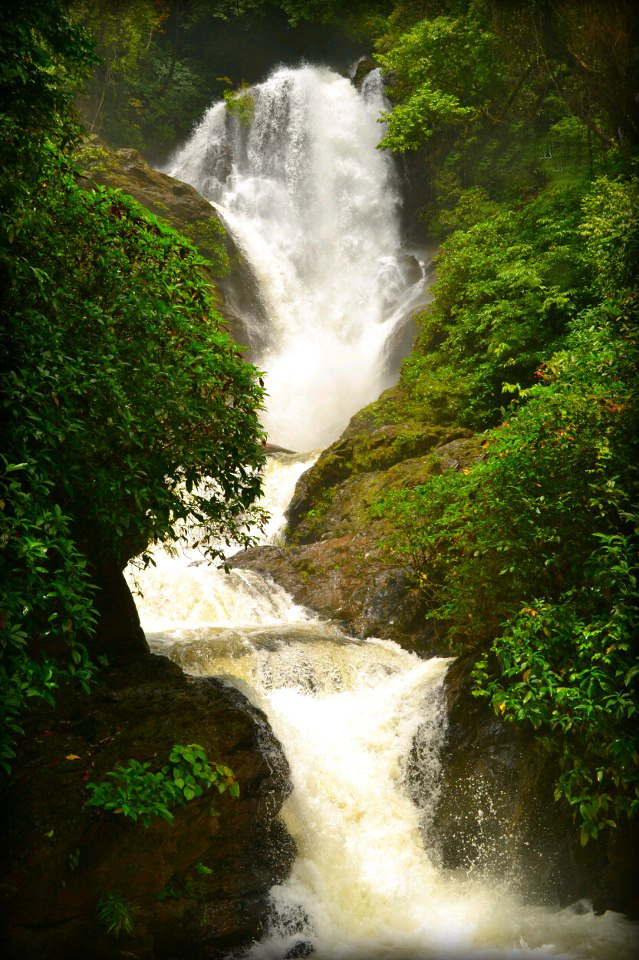
Vibuthi Water Falls

Vibhuthi Falls is located in Achave Gram panchayat, Ankola taluk of Uttara Kannada district in Karnataka, India. The word "Vibhuthi" means limestone. The water in this falls comes past limestone rocks near Yana and so the falls is called as "Vibhuthi Falls". Nearest towns near Vibhuthi Falls are Sirsi, Kumta, Ankola, Gokarna.

The falls are in the Karavali region of Karnataka, accessible by road from SH143 of Karnataka State. The nearest railway station is in Kumta, about 40 km from Vibhuthi Falls.
