= Mahabaleshwar Temple, Gokarna =

Hindu temple in Karnataka state, India

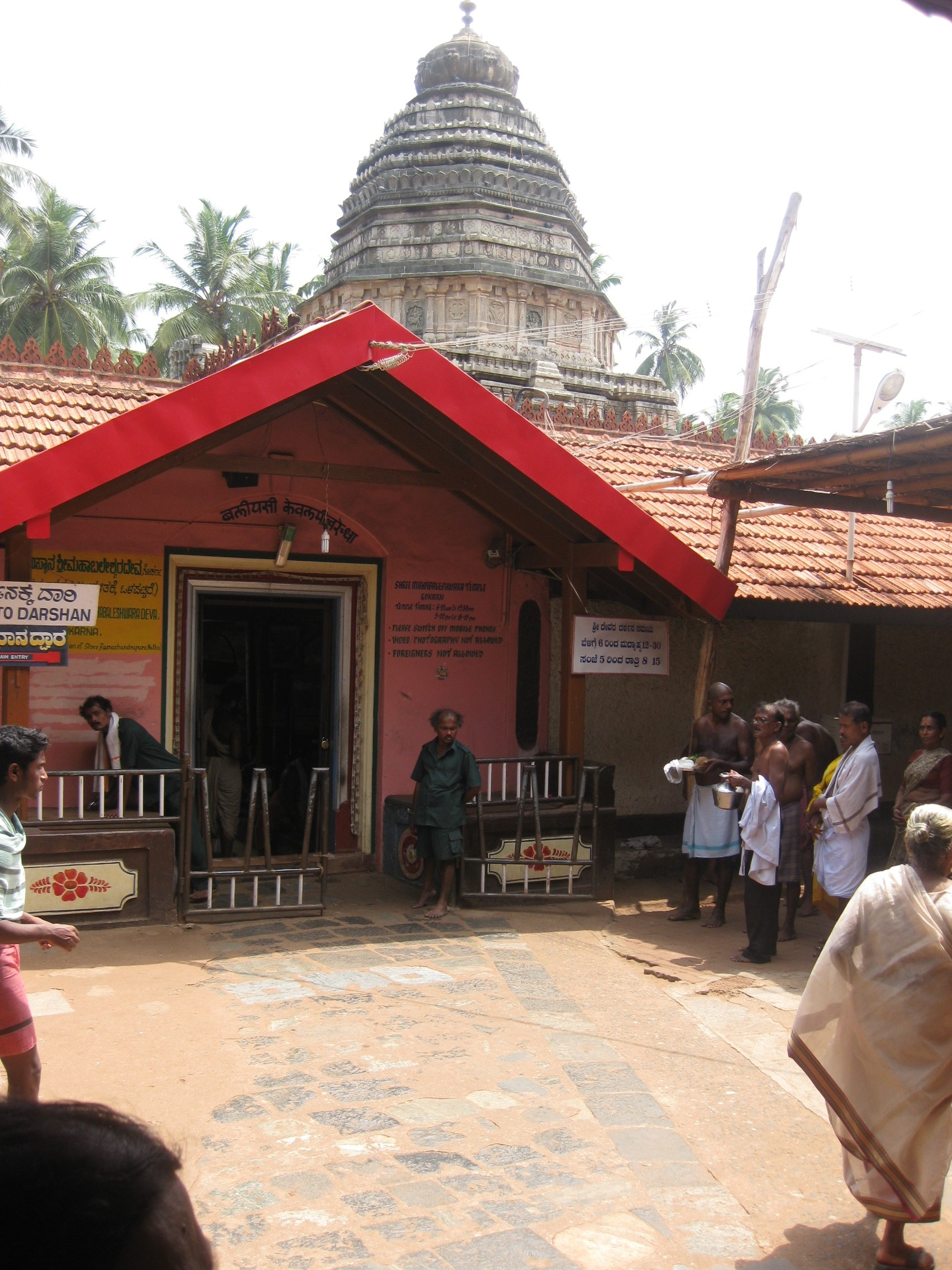
- Mahabaleshwar Temple at Gokarna

- Location within Karnataka

Religion
- Affiliation: Hinduism
- District: Uttara Kannada District
- Deity: Shiva
- Festivals: Maha Shivaratri, Ratha Yatra

Location
- Location: Gokarna
- State: Karnataka
- Country: India
- Coordinates: 14°32′36″N 74°18′59″E

Architecture
- Type: Dravidian architecture
- Creator: Temple constructed atop aldready present Linga by Mayuravarma of Kadamba
- Completed: 345–365 CE

The Mahabaleshwar Temple, Gokarna is a 4th-century-CE Hindu temple in Gokarna, Uttara Kannada district, Karnataka state, India, built in the classical Dravidian architectural style. The temple faces the Gokarna beach on the Arabian Sea. It houses a lingam (an aniconic form of Shiva) called the atmalinga or the pranalinga.

It is one of the 275 paadal petra sthalam temples expounded in the Tevaram, a sacred Tamil Shaivite text written during the 6th-7th centuries by the poet-saints called the Nayanars.

== Description ==
The temple is one of the seven sacred Muktikshetras or Muktisthala ("places of salvation") in Karnataka, alongside Udupi, Kollur, Subrahmanya, Kumbasi, Koteshvara, and Sankaranarayana. It is a place where many Hindus of Karnataka perform obsequies (death rites) for their departed.

The classical Sanskrit writer, Kalidasa mentions the "Lord of Gokarna" in his 4th-century work, Raghuvamsha.

The temple is a large complex of shrines and much of it belongs to the later Vijayanagara period (1336–1646 CE).

In 1676, Fryer, an English traveller, visited Gokarna during the Maha Shivaratri festival and wrote in detail about it.

Currently, the administrative charge of the temple is with an Overseeing Committee under the Chairmanship of Justice BN Srikrishna, a Retired Justice of the Hon'ble Supreme Court of India.

== Legend ==
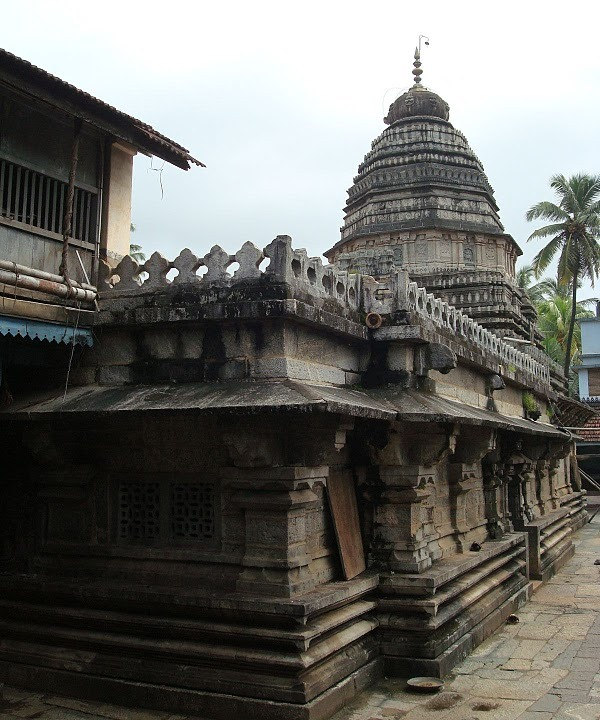
Temple seen from inside the complex.

The legend of the temple links Ravana, the rakshasa (demon) king of Lanka, to both the lingam enshrined in the Mahabaleshwar Temple and to Gokarna's Bhadrakali Temple.

According to tradition, Ravana's mother, a devotee of Shiva, worshipped a lingam to ensure prosperity for her son. Jealous of her devotion, Indra, the king of heaven, stole the lingam and cast it into the sea. Distraught over her disrupted worship, Ravana's mother went on a hunger strike. Ravana pledged to travel to Kailasha, the abode of Shiva, to retrieve the atmalinga for her.

At Kailasha, Ravana performed severe penance to venerate Shiva and sang the Shiva Tandava Stotram hymn. He severed his own head and constructed a harp using threads drawn from his skin and intestines. Pleased by his devotion, Shiva granted him a boon. Ravana requested the atmalinga, which Shiva granted on the condition that wherever it was placed on the ground, it would remain permanently rooted at that spot. Having obtained the boon, Ravana began his journey back to Lanka.

As Ravana approached Gokarna, Vishnu obscured the sun to give the appearance of dusk. Ravana realised he needed to perform his evening rituals, but was unable to do so while holding the atmalinga. Ganesha appeared disguised as a Brahmin boy. Ravana requested that he hold the atmalinga without placing it on the ground. Ganesha agreed on the condition that he would call Ravana thrice, and if Ravana failed to return within that time, he would place the atmalinga on the ground.

Ganesha called out thrice in rapid succession. When Ravana failed to return in time, Ganesha placed the atmalinga on the ground and vanished with his cows. Ravana pursued the only cow that was going underground, managing to grasp its ear before the rest of its body disappeared beneath the earth. The petrified form of this ear gave the place the name Gokarna (from the Sanskrit go, meaning "cow", and karna, meaning "ear").

Ravana failed to dislodge the lingam despite his best efforts, fainting in the attempt. He bestowed upon the lingam the epithet Mahabaleshwara (the lord of great strength). Tradition holds that these events established three associated sacred sites in Gokarna: the Gokarna rock formation, the atmalinga housed in the Mahabaleshwar Temple, and the Bhadrakali Temple.

It is believed that the deity of the temple bestows immense blessings to devotees to those who touch or glimpse it.

== Temple structure ==
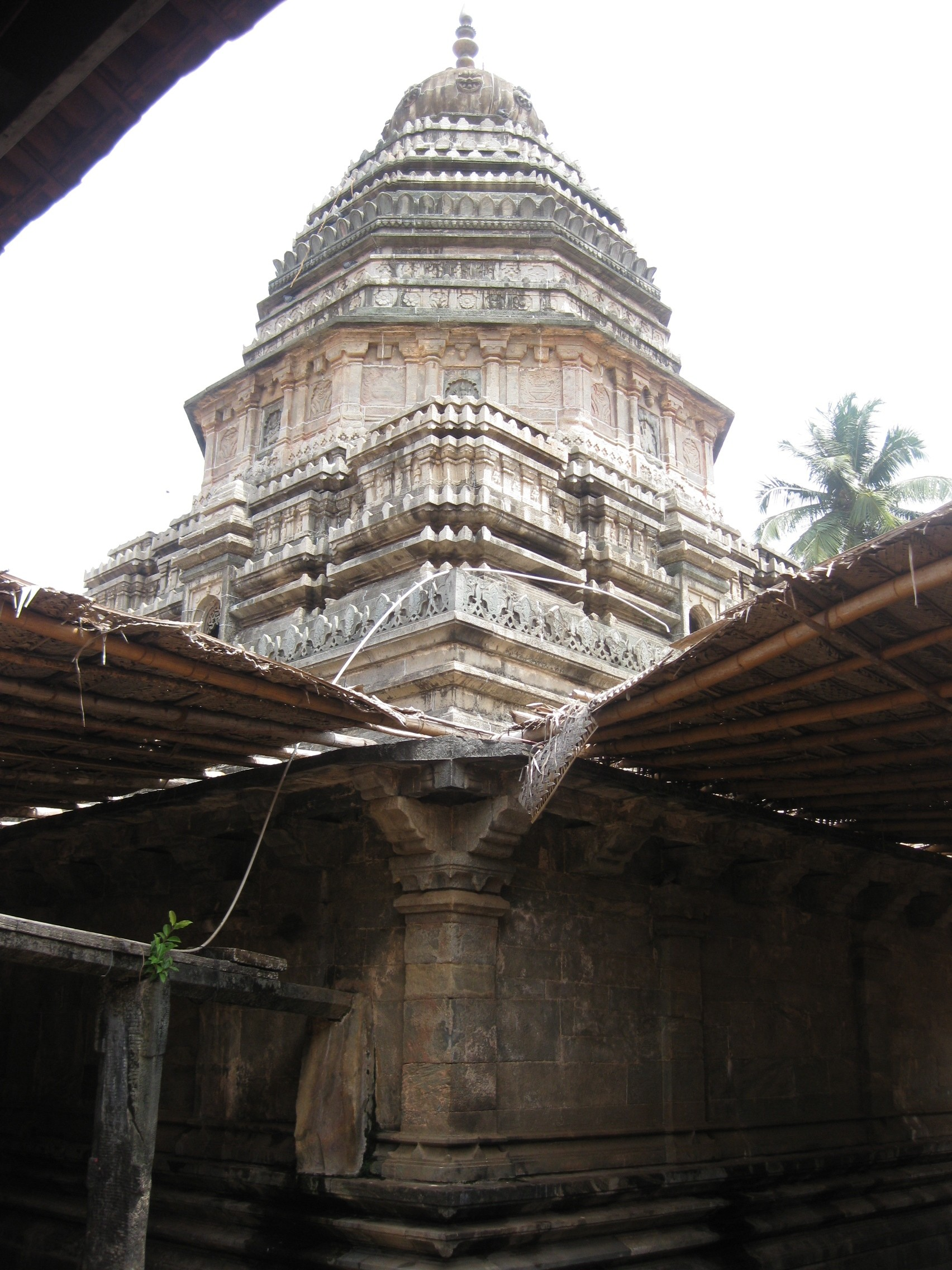
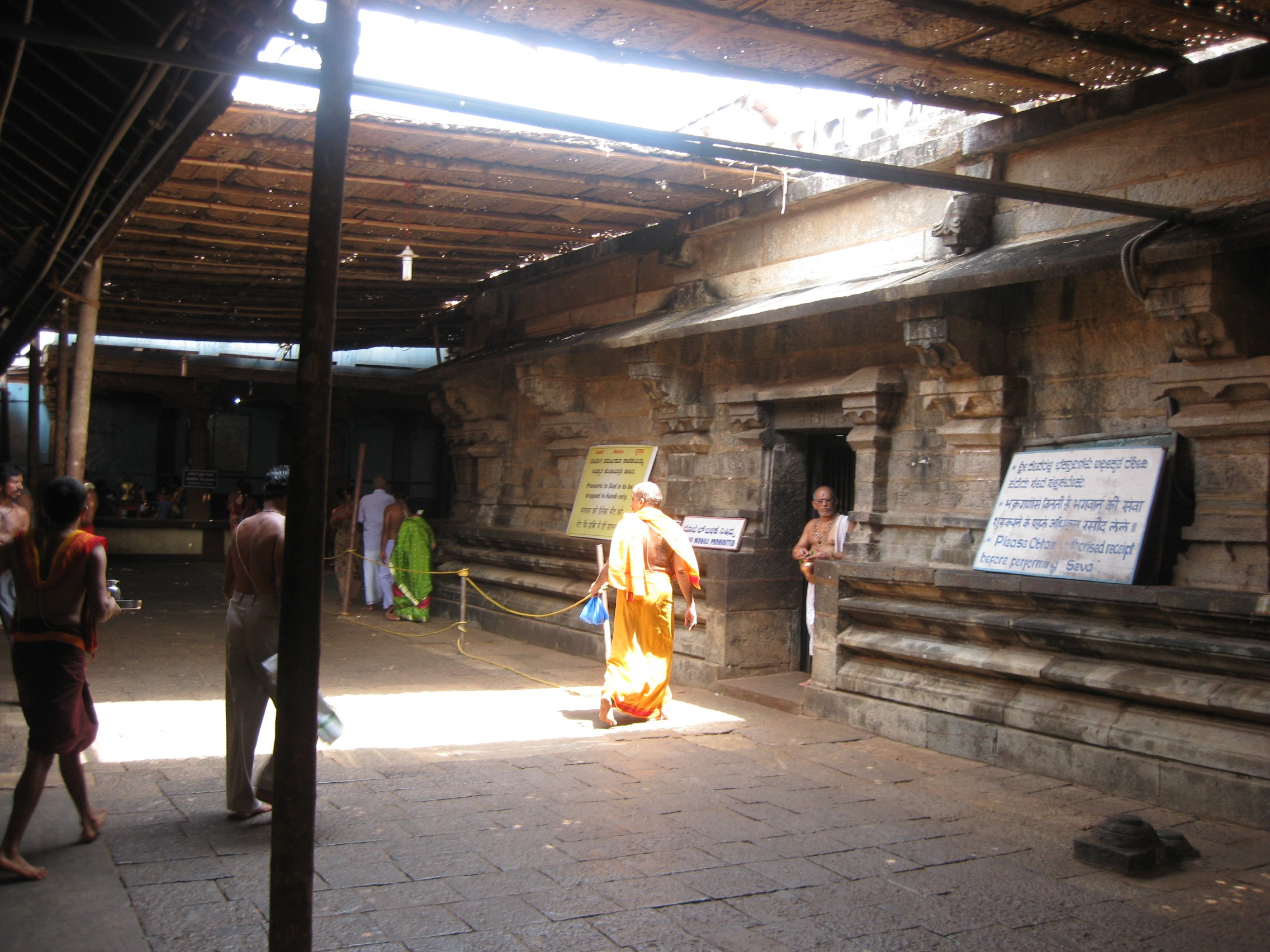
Left: Dravidian style Gopura of Mahabaleshwar temple at Gokarna. Right: Pradakshinapath (circumambulatory path) of Mahabaleshwar temple at Gokarna.

The temple is built of granite in the Dravidian architectural style. The atmalinga is enshrined in the temple on a square Saligrama Pitha (pedestal). The pedestal has a small hole at its centre from where devotees can see the top of the atmalinga.

== Festival ==
The Maha Shivaratri festival, the observance of the union of Shiva and Parvati, is celebrated in Gokarna on the 14th day of the dark fortnight in the month of Magha, either in February or March, when a very large number of pilgrims visit the shrine. During the festival, a ratha yatra (a procession in a large wooden chariot) is held. Images of Shiva and other deities are installed in a chariot which is ceremoniously pulled through the town by the devotees, accompanied by drum bands. The ratha yatra starts from the Shri Maha Ganapati temple at the terminus of the main market street, also known as "Car Street".
