= Interstate 140 =

Interstate 140 may refer to:

- Interstate 140 (North Carolina), a spur route near Wilmington, North Carolina
  - Interstate 240 (North Carolina), a bypass of Asheville, North Carolina, formerly known as I-140
  - Interstate 140 (North Carolina 1999), a cancelled proposed spur between Sanford and Raleigh, North Carolina
- Interstate 140 (Tennessee), a spur route in Knoxville, Tennessee
