= Washington State Route 143 =

There have been two state highways in Washington numbered 143:

- Washington State Route 143 (1964-1967) into Mount Rainier National Park, now SR 123
- Washington State Route 143 (1973-1985) across the Columbia River at Plymouth, now part of I-82
