= Vermont Route 142 =

State highway in Windham County, Vermont, US

Vermont Route 142
- Fort Bridgman Road
- VT 142 highlighted in red

Route information
- Maintained by VTrans
- Length: 10.847 mi (17.457 km)

Major junctions
- South end: Route 142 at the Massachusetts state line in Vernon
- North end: US 5 in Brattleboro

Location
- Country: United States
- State: Vermont
- Counties: Windham

Highway system
- State highways in Vermont
| ← VT 141 | → VT 143 |

Vermont Route 142 (VT 142) is a 10.847-mile-long (17.457 km) north–south state highway in Vermont, United States. It runs from the Massachusetts state line northward through the town of Vernon to the town of Brattleboro, ending at an intersection with U.S. Route 5 (US 5).

== Route description ==
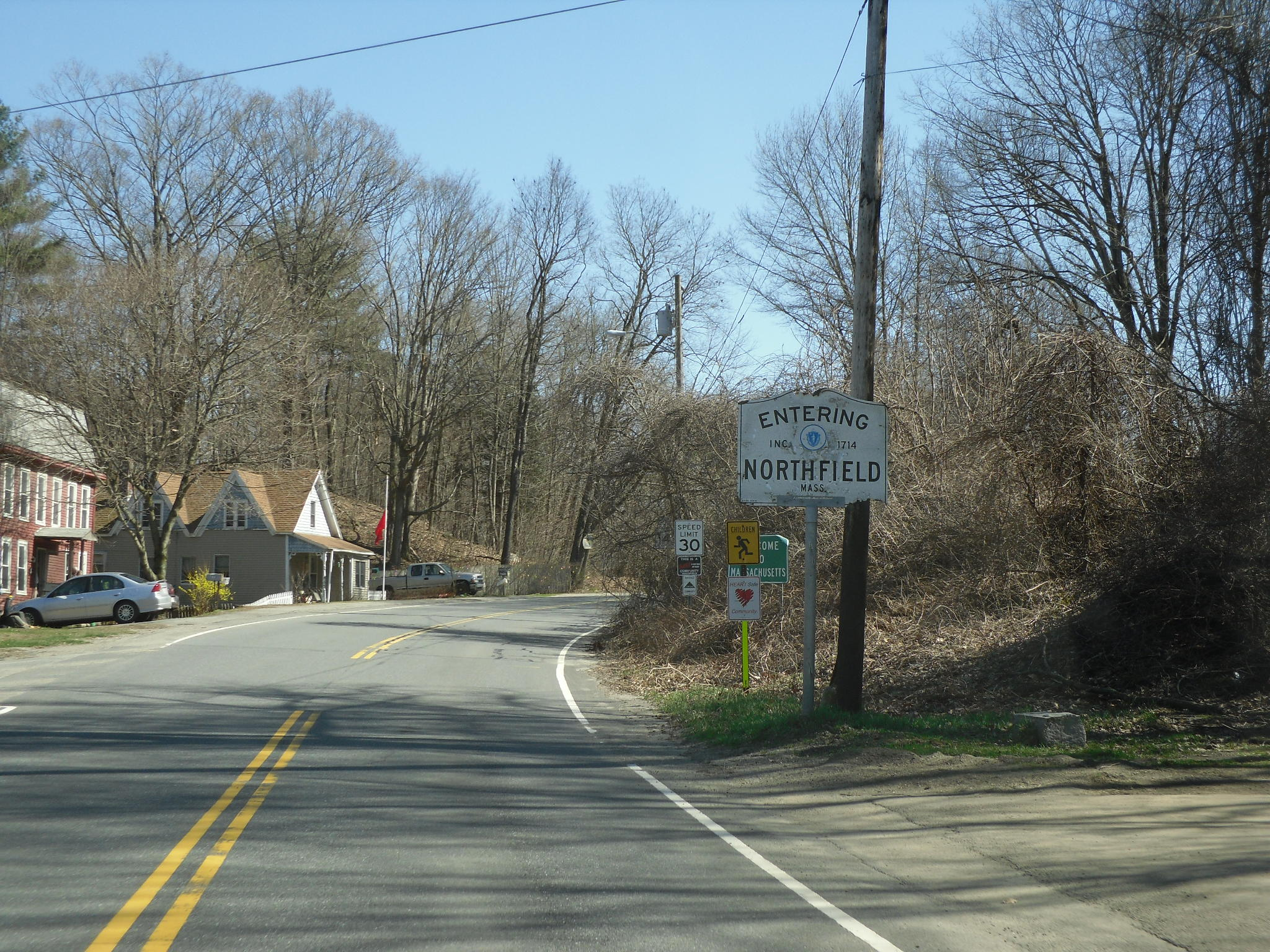
VT 142 in South Vernon, approaching the Massachusetts state line

Vermont Route 142 begins at the state border in Vernon, where it continues southbound as Massachusetts Route 142 in the town of Northfield. Route 142 heads north into the town of Vernon, serving the town center before winding north towards Brattleboro. En route to the city, Route 142 parallels Interstate 91 and US-5, which run to the west, and New Hampshire Route 119, which runs just east of the Connecticut River. Route 142 spends its entire length hugging the river, never straying far from its west bank. It runs directly next to the river upon crossing into Brattleboro, proceeding into the heart of the town, where it ends at an intersection with US-5 and Route 119, which begins at the same intersection. Route 119, the second shortest Vermont route at just 0.08-mile (0.13 km) in length (but fully signed nonetheless), crosses the bridge to the east, becoming NH-119 and proceeding south along the east bank of the river, opposite Route 142. US-5 southbound provides access to I-91 at Exit 1, and US-5 northbound provides access to Vermont Route 9 and Vermont Route 30, which intersect less than 0.5 miles (0.8 km) to the north.

== Major intersections ==
The entire route is in Windham County.

| Location | mi | km | Destinations | Notes |
|---|---|---|---|---|
| Vernon | 0.000 | 0.000 | Route 142 south | Continuation into Massachusetts |
| Brattleboro | 10.838 | 17.442 | VT 119 east – Hinsdale NH | Western terminus of VT 119 |
| Brattleboro | 10.847 | 17.457 | US 5 to I-91 / VT 9 / VT 30 – Guilford, Manchester | Northern terminus |
1.000 mi = 1.609 km; 1.000 km = 0.621 mi
