= List of highways numbered 137 =

The following highways are numbered 137:

== Canada ==
- Ontario Highway 137
- Prince Edward Island Route 137
- Quebec Route 137

== Costa Rica ==
- National Route 137

== Japan ==
- Japan National Route 137
- Fukuoka Prefectural Route 137
- Nara Prefectural Route 137

== Malaysia ==
- Malaysia Federal Route 137

== United Kingdom ==
- A137 road
- B137 road

== United States ==
- Alabama State Route 137
  - County Route 137 (Lee County, Alabama)
    - County Route 137A (Lee County, Alabama)
    - County Route 137B (Lee County, Alabama)
- Arkansas Highway 137
- California State Route 137
- Connecticut Route 137
- Florida State Road 137 (former)
  - County Road 137 (Hamilton County, Florida)
  - County Road 137 (Suwannee County, Florida)
- Georgia State Route 137
- Hawaii Route 137
- Illinois Route 137
- Iowa Highway 137
- K-137 (Kansas highway)
- Kentucky Route 137
- Louisiana Highway 137 (former)
- Maine State Route 137
- Maryland Route 137
- Massachusetts Route 137
- M-137 (Michigan highway) (former)
- Missouri Route 137
- Nebraska Highway 137
- New Hampshire Route 137
- New Mexico State Road 137
- New York State Route 137
  - County Route 137 (Cortland County, New York)
  - County Route 137 (Erie County, New York)
  - County Route 137 (Fulton County, New York)
  - County Route 137 (Niagara County, New York)
  - County Route 137 (Schenectady County, New York)
  - County Route 137 (Westchester County, New York)
- North Carolina Highway 137
- Ohio State Route 137
- Oklahoma State Highway 137
- Pennsylvania Route 137 (former)
- South Carolina Highway 137
- Tennessee State Route 137
- Texas State Highway 137
  - Texas State Highway Loop 137 (two former highways)
  - Farm to Market Road 137
- Utah State Route 137
- Virginia State Route 137
  - Virginia State Route 137 (1930-1932) (former)
- Wisconsin Highway 137
- Wyoming Highway 137 (former)

=== Territories ===
- Puerto Rico Highway 137

Preceded by 136	Lists of highways 137	Succeeded by 138
