= Gonehalli =

- village
- Location in Karnataka, India Gonehalli (India)
- Coordinates: 14.5540500°N 74.3547670°E
- Country: India
- State: Karnataka
- District: Uttara Kannada

Government
  - Type: Panchayati raj (India)
  - Body: Gram panchayat

Languages
  - Official: Kannada
- Time zone: UTC+5:30 (IST)
- ISO 3166 code: IN-KA
- Vehicle registration: KA
- Website: karnataka.gov.in

Gonehalli is a small village in Kumta taluka. Its neighboring villages are Torke, Devarbhavi and Bankikodla.

== Notable people ==
- Bala Saheb
- N. H. Gouda

== See also ==
- Karwar
- Ankola
- Mangalore
- Kumta
