= Gangadhar V. Chittal =

Indian writer

Gangadhar Vithoba Chittal
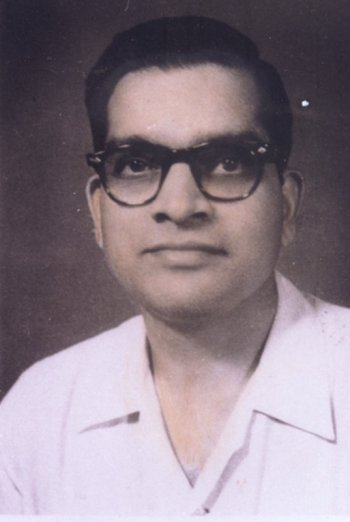
- Born: 12 November 1923; Hanehalli, Uttar Kannada, Karnataka, India
- Died: 28 January 1987 (aged 63); Mumbai, Maharashtra, India
- Occupations: Poet, Indian Audit and Account Service
- Spouse: Meera Krishna Gaitonde from Karwar
- Writing career
- Genre: Poetry
- Subject: Kannada

Gangadhar Vithoba Chittal (12 November 1923 – 28 January 1987) was an Indian Kannada poet and recipient of Karnataka Sahitya Academy award. He was the elder brother of Kannada writer Yashwant Vithoba Chittal.He held several administrative positions for the Government of India and audited several Indian Embassies and Consulates. During the Quit India struggle (1942), Chittal amongst several others was debarred from his college due to his participation in the Quit India movement.

== Early life ==
Born in Hanehalli's Chittal Family, Gangadhar Chittal completed primary education in his hometown and Matriculation (S.S.C.) from Gibbs High School, Kumta in 1940 and stood first in the Presidency of Bombay. His achievement was all the more commendable since the then Presidency of Bombay included current states of Maharashtra, Gujarat, part of Karnataka and part of Madhya Pradesh. For his achievement Chittal was honored at Karnatak College Dharwar where he completed his initial studies and then went to Willingdon college, Sangli to major in English literature. At Willingdon S. R. Ekkundi was Chittal's classmate and V. K. Gokak and R. S. Mugali were his professors.

After graduating from Sangli, Chittal joined the Indian Audit and Account Service in 1948. Initially he worked as assistant accountant general in Bombay and then moved to Washington, D.C. as deputy director of audit. After completion of his stint in Washington, D.C., he was transferred to New Delhi as deputy secretary in Irrigation and Power Ministry and then as comptroller and auditor general in New Delhi. Subsequently, he moved to London as director of audits. He retired as director of audits, at western railways, in Bombay.

In 1983, he was honored by the Karnataka Sahitya Academy (Karnatak State Literary Society) for his contributions to Kannada literature.

At an early age Chittal was afflicted with Parkinson's disease which curtailed his gifted and exceptional literary career. He succumbed to the disease at the age of 63.

== Selected books ==
- Kaalad Kare
- Manu Kulad Haadu
- Hariva Neeridu
- Samparka
- Samagra Kavya
