= Anandashram High School, Bankikodla =

Anandashram High School
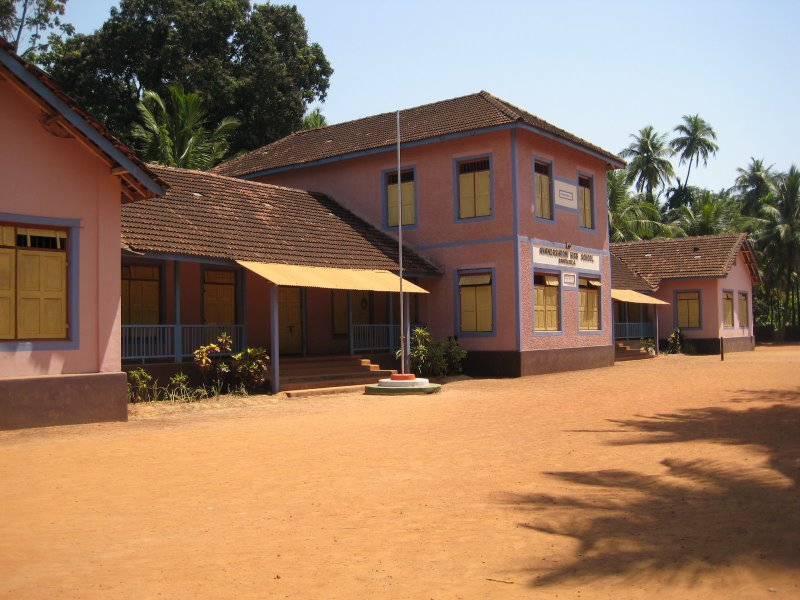
- A. H. School

Location
- Bankikodla-Hanehalli, Karnataka; India
- Coordinates: 14°34′30″N 74°19′16″E

Information
- Type: Private/public
- Established: 1884
- President: Dattanand S. Balwally (1965-66 batch student) preceded by Mr. Gopalkrishna Nadkarni (1947-48 batch student)
- Head of school: Gangadhar Bhat of Yallapur
- Staff: Mira Manjeshwar
- Affiliation: Karnataka State Education Board
- Website: Wikimedia

Ananadasharm High School one of the oldest high schools in Uttar Kannada, was a private school located in Bankikodla-Hanehalli. Anandasharm High School is providing education from eighth standard through tenth standard (S. S. L. C). The medium of instruction is Kannada. The Rural Education Society (RES) started the high school funded by Mangesh N. Kulakrni, Ananth Ramachandra Kagal family, and D. M. Nadkarni the Chitrapur Saraswat Brahmins and the others from Bankikodla-Hanehalli. Kulkarni was a printing press owner in Mumbai whereas Kagal was Chief Inspector of Factories, Bombay. Anandasharm is the name of ninth Guru of Chitrapur Saraswats CSBs (they are called 'Bhanaps' in Mumbai). Ramakanth V. Pandit from Aghanashini was the first headmaster of the high school from 1941 to 1966. He was a B. A (mathematics), B.T., M.Ed. The high school is now supported by the Karnataka Secondary Education Board, Bangalore.

In the early years of the high school, high school accommodated students from 5th grade to 11th grade S.S.C and some subjects were taught in English.

== History ==
The history of this high school goes back to its middle school the vernacular school of 1884. The leaders of Chitrapur Saraswat Brahmins during the British rule in India took the task of spreading education. Ananth Shanthappayya Nadkarni a.k.a. Budavant master from Bankikodla started the school in 1884. Datt master (D. A. Nadkarni a nephew of headmaster Ananth S. Nadkarni) was the headmaster of this middle school from 1911 to 1941. Perhaps, the vernacular middle school of 1884 is considered as one of the oldest vernacular schools in the nation. Later the middle school was upgraded to Anandasharm High School in 1941. In the early days, classes were held in Bakanatheshwar temple and in Dinu Master's (D. M. Nadkarni) house.

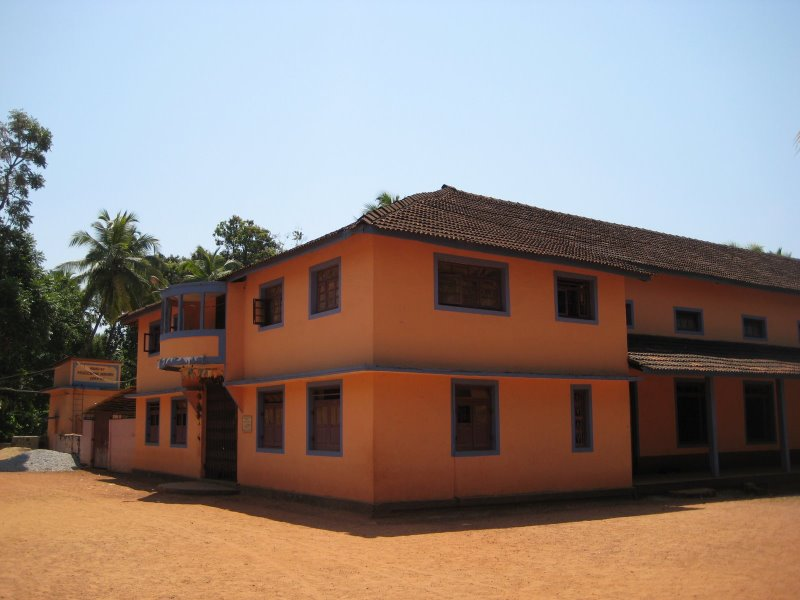
The new building in 1988 - Contributions from the alumni and the RES.

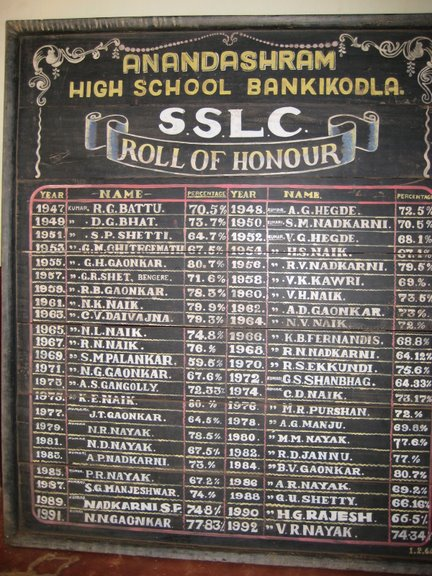
The Roll of Honour the Veledictorians from the first SSC batch starting 1946-47.

== Former Headmasters of the Anandasharm High School ==
- R. V. Pandit (1911 – 1999), from Aghanashini, in school 1941 - 1966, 1941 - 1966 as headmaster
- Su Ram Ekkundi (1922 – 1995), from Ranebennur, in school 1944 - 1976, 1966 - 76 as headmaster
- N. S. Naik (1927 – 2008), from Bankikodla-Hanehalli, in school 1948 - 1982, 1976 - 1982 as headmaster

== Notable former teachers of the High School ==
- Narayan H. Gouda
- Gourish Kaikini
- Subbanna R. Ekkundi

== Notable alumni ==
- Gopal H. Gaonkar
- Narayan H. Gowda, Kadame
- Mangesh V. Nadkarni
- Sundar V. Nadkarni
- Niranjan K. Naik, Agragone

== Former Headmasters of the Middle School ==
- Ananth S. Nadkarni a.k.a. Budavanta master from Bankikodla started the Verrnacular School in 1884 and served until 1910 as headmaster
- Datt master Nadkarni (D. A. Nadkarni) (Doddmane) (1878 - 1954) from Bankikodla, Vernacular School, in school 1898 - 1941, 1911 - 1941 as headmaster

== Notable alumni of the Middle School ==
- Gangadhar V. Chittal
- Yashwant V. Chittal
