= Dundkuli =

Village in Karnataka, India

Dundakuli ದುಂಡಕುಳಿ
- Village in Kumta Taluk
- Country: India
- State: Karnataka
- District: Uttara Kannada
- Taluk: Kumta
- Time zone: UTC+5:30 (IST)
- Postal code: 581440

Dundakuli or Dundkuli is a village in Kumta on the western coast of India, in the Uttara Kannada district of the state of Karnataka. It belongs to the Belegavi division.

== See also ==
- Gokarna
- Kumta
- Hegde (village)
