= B. V. Naik =

Indian politician

B. V. Nayak
- Gonehalli, Kumat, Uttara Kannada District
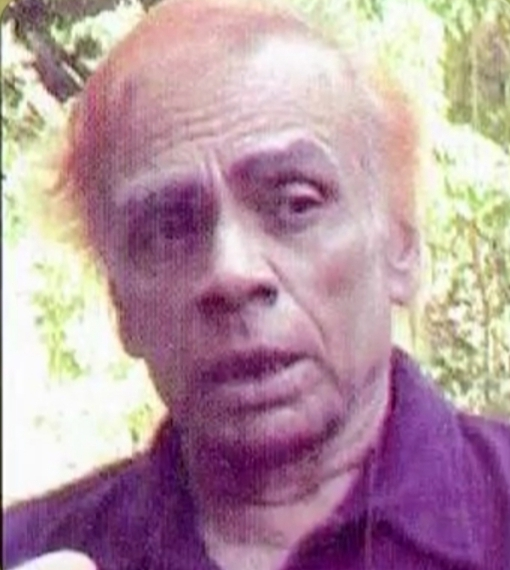

Personal details
- Born: 1929 Karnataka, India
- Died: 16 August 2008 Kumta
- Occupation: Member of Parliament (India)

Balakrishna Venkanna Nayak M.P. (1929–2008) was known to the people of Karnataka by his nickname, Balasaheb. He was elected from the Karwar District Constituency (Uttar Kannada) in 1971 to Loka Sabha (the lower house), of the Parliament of India.

== Career ==
Balasaheb was the youngest son of Barrister Venkanna H. Nayak (Gati Saheb). Balasaheb lost his father when he was four months old and his mother Parvati Naik raised him in Belgaum, Karnataka, along with two of his elder siblings. He attended Banaras Hindu University and in 1952, he was awarded M.Sc. with distinction in agricultural science. In 1958, he was selected by the Central Government to study advanced agricultural sciences in Sweden for two years. He became the Joint Registrar of the Cooperative Department, Karnataka at the age of 36 in 1965. However, he resigned in 1970 at the age of 40 to join the Indira Gandhi's Congress Party. In 1971 he contested in the Lokasabha election representing Indian National Congress Party (Mrs. Gandhi's Congress). He won the election with a landslide margin against Dinakara Desai.

Balasaheb served as the chairman of the "All India Nuclear Energy Subcommittee", 1972–75 . He was also the member of the Defense Subcommittee under the chairmanship of Jagjivan Ram, the Defense Minister in Mrs. Gandhi's cabinet.

Balasaheb was a close friend of Piloo Mody who was the founder and President of the Swatantra Party. Piloo Mody recommended to Morarji Desai, the Prime minister of India (77–79) that Balasaheb be appointed as the Governor General of Andaman and Nicobar Islands. However, Balasaheb turned down the proposal as Morarji Desai was elected by the Janata Party (Fractious Coalition Party) which was not Balasaheb's political party during that time.

== His views ==
His book, "Long Long Way to Go" was a contradictory illustration of the Indira Gandhi's ruling party that was plagued with corruption. The objective of the book was to introduce corrective methods to curb the corruption but the publication was not well received by Mrs. Gandhi. Balasaheb published Janadhwani (voice of the people) a weekly Kannada news paper, 1977–2005. His newspaper mainly vindicated the rights of commoners. Balasaheb was an honorary advisor and a regular contributor of editorials to Karavali Munjavu a Kannada newspaper published from Karwar. Balasaheb was guided by his own principles. He later contested again as an independent candidate for Lok Sabha and lost. He was a passionate reader and revolutionary thinker. He always gave the example of Galileo whose theory in astronomy was not accepted for a long time. Like an average Indian, Balasaheb chose to retire in Gonehalli village in a small bungalow with three rooms. His mode of transportation was a bicycle. Along his bike ride, he waved to the people standing by the wayside and hollered "Jayawagali" (Success to thee). All his life, he fought against corruption.

Balasaheb died on 16 August 2008 in Kumta and was cremated in Gonehalli, his village.

== Gallery ==
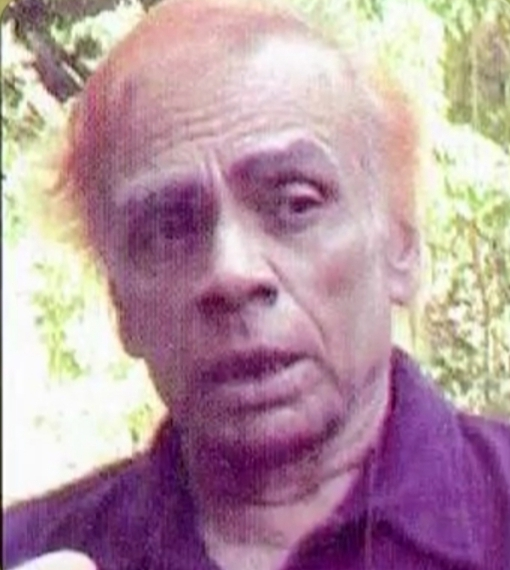
B. V. Nayak, Gonehalli

=== Published books ===
- Future of Global Society- 2004
- Long Long Way To Go- 1974
- Dwitiya Ganarajyadatt- 1978
