= Torke =

Torke village
- Village
- Location in Karnataka, India Torke village (India)
- Coordinates: 14.55°N 74.31667°E
- Country: India
- State: Karnataka
- District: Uttara Kannada
- Elevation: 586 m (1,923 ft)

Languages
  - Official: Kannada
- Time zone: UTC+5:30 (IST)

Torke is a small village in Kumta taluk of Uttara Kannada district, Karnataka, India. This village is about a few square kilometres in extent. Torke traditionally is the amalgamation of Hoskatt, Naranapur, Toregazani, Torke, Devarabhavi, Hallergudi, Devana and Gonehalli. It has a Gram Panchayat.

The name "Torke" is supposed to have originated from "tore", the rivulet that used to flow through the village. Local names like "torehalla" and "toregazani" also give credence to this theory. However, since this place is famous for production of salt, and a salt maker is also known to be called a "thoreya" in Kannada, Torke might also have got its name from that.

== Climate ==
The village is a west coastal lowland and forms part of the Western Ghats. It is characterized by high temperatures throughout the year. The rainfall here is seasonal, but heavy and is about 350 cm (140 in) a year. Most of the rain is received in the period from June to November, mainly through south-west Monsoon. This suits paddy cultivation and is adequate for the growth of vegetation during the entire year. December to May is the dry months with very little rainfall which helps in Salt production. The "Naranapur" gazani is famous for salt production.

== People ==
Its total population is about 1309. The major community residing in this place is Nadavaru / Nadava Most people presently residing in Torke are agriculturists. Others indulge in salt production, government jobs, contracting, etc.

Apart from a sizeable "Halakki-Vokkaliga"community in "Devana", a moderate sized "Harikantra" or fishermen community is also found in Hoskatt.

== Places of interest ==
Devarabhavi, a hamlet of Torke has a famous temple called "Kengala parameshwari" which is named after the sacred "Kengalu" or "red coloured rice grains" being offered as "Prasad" in the temple. The small forest surrounding the temple is known as "Devarakaanu" or "Kaanu".

A centuries-old Hero stone or "Veeragallu", a carved slab of stone depicting the life of an ancient "Veera" or a brave soldier can be seen in Torke.

A building called "Ramakrishna Mandira" or popularly known as "Sanghada Mane" was built in the 1940s to house functions of Nadavara Sangha. However this building was recently demolished to make room for a new multipurpose community Hall. A new building is inaugurated.

“A new temple, the Maha Sati Paada Temple, has been built at the site where the Veeragallu once stood. The temple was inaugurated, and the Praana Pratishta ceremony was performed on May 8, 2025.”

== Festivals ==
In the Hindu month of Bhaadrapad, "Torke" celebrates more than 50-year-old "Sarvajanik Ganeshotsva ". The celebrations last three days.

Apart from a Navaratri celebration or "Maali Pooje", every summer people of Torke and surroundings also celebrate a two-day Bandihabba in its Kengala Parameshwari Temple. This "Bandihabba" culminates in animal sacrifice known as "Kolkuri".

Deepavali is known as "Doddahabba" or the major festival and "Lakshmi Pooja" and "Balipaadya" hold special significance for businessmen and farmers of Torke respectively.

Suggi or the festival of harvest is important for Halakki vokkaligas from Devana.

== Transport ==
Torke is connected by road. It lies on the connecting road to Gokarna. NH-17 is about 4.5 km away. The nearest railway station is situated in Madanageri and is called "Gokarna Road" station.

== Education ==
Torke primary school is one of the first few primary schools in Karwar district. Ramakrishna Kawari II (born 1830) and his father Honnayya Kawari started this school in 1850s. It is still serving the community at primary level. Shri Sadguru Nityanand High-School, Sanikatta is the nearest high school. V. K. Kawari, and G. P. Nayak from this village were the first two head masters of the high school at Sanikatta. Students from Torke go to Ankola or Kumta for their college education. However, now college education is also available in Gokarna. Prior to 1964, high schools at Gokarna and Bankikodla served as their high schools for many years. Anandashram High School was the first high school for Torke students.

== Notable people ==
- SAPA. Gaonkar
- Gopalkrishna P. Nayak

== See also ==
- Karwar
- Mangalore
- Bankikodla-Hanehalli
- Gokarna
- Madngeri
