= Gopalkrishna P. Nayak =

Gopalkrishna Pandurang Nayak, known as Gaonkar, (3 September 1927 – 5 February 2017) from Torke village was a drama writer in the Kannada language. In 2000, he was awarded Karnataka Sahitya Akademi for his work in drama writings. He was also awarded Yakshgana Sahitya Prashasti.

G. P. Nayak was born in Hiregutti village. He earned his high school diploma (1945) from Gibbs High School, Kumta and a B.Sc. degree (1950) from the Karnataka College, Dharwar. After working almost two decades, he retired as head master of Shri Sadguru Nityanand High-School, Sanikatta village. Prior to this, Nayak was Principal of the Primary School Teachers Training College Ankola.

After retirement, Nayak lived in Hubli and died on 5 February 2017.

== Drama ==
- A Ratri (ಆ ರಾತ್ರಿ)
- Nata Nayak (ನಟನಾಯಕ)
- Indin Soanshar
- Nuru Rupai Notu
- Abba Ninu Hudugi

== Others ==
- Nade Nudi
- Vinoba
- Krantiy Kidigalu
