= Dayanand S. Nadkarni =

Indian politician

D. S. Nadkarni

Personal details
- Born: 1910 Bankikodla
- Died: 2000 (aged 89–90) Ankola
- Occupation: Member of Legislative Assembly, Karnataka

Dayanand Sarveshwar Nadkarni (1910–2000) was an activist, a freedom fighter, and a member of the Legislative Assembly to the Karnataka State, Bangalore during 1967-1971 (from Ankola Constituency as a Praja Socialist Party candidate), when Veerendra Patil was the chief minister of the Karnataka state. Nadkarni was also the founder member of The Kanara Welfare Trust.

== Early career ==
D. S. Nadkarni was originally from Bankikodla village. Around 1955, Nadkarni migrated to Ankola to work with Dinakara Desai; Nadkarni was right hand-man of Dinakara Desai. Nadkarni was a member of the Rural Education Society of the Chitrapur Saraswats who founded the A. H. School.
