= The Boy who Talked to Trees =

1983 book by Yashwant Vithoba Chittal

- Author: Yashwant V. Chittal
- Language: Kannada, and English language
- Genre: Short story collections
- Publisher: Penguin books
- Publication date: 1983
- Publication place: India
- Media type: Print

The Boy who Talked to Trees is a collection of short stories by Yashwant V. Chittal who received the Sahitya Akademi Award in 1983. The book was translated into English by Ramachandra Shrama and Padma Ramachandra in 1994 published by Penguin Books. The book includes 13 stories, all set in his birthplace, the village of Hanehalli or in Bandra a suburban area in the city of Mumbai. Each of the stories in this collection revolves around a situation in which ordinary men and women are subjected to extreme pressures. Katheyadalu Hudugi ("The Girl Who Became A story") received the National award.
