= Mangesh V. Nadkarni =

Indian professor (1933–2007)

Prof. Mangesh Vithal Nadkarni
- Born: March 6, 1933; Kodibag, Mysore State (British Raj)
- Died: September 23, 2007 (aged 74); Pondicherry (India)
- Occupation: Professor
- Years active: 1957-2007 (50 years)
- Title: Professor
- Spouse: Smt. Meera Mallapur
- Parent(s): Smt. Indira Kaushik and Sri Vithal Nadkarni

Academic background
- Education: B.A. (Poona) (1954); M.A. (Poona) (1957); PGDTE (CIEFL) (1963); M.A. (California) (1967); Ph.D. (California) (1970); Rajaram College, Kolhapur (Maharashtra); CIEFL, Hyderabad (Telangana); University of California, Los Angeles (United States)
- Thesis: NP-embedded Structures in Kannada and Konkani (1970)
- Doctoral advisor: William O. Bright
- Other advisors: Barbara H. Partee, George D. Bedell, Russell N. Campbell, Kees W. Bolle

Mangesh Vithal Nadkarni (1933–2007) was a professor of English literature, and a disciple of Sri Aurobindo. He lectured on Sri Aurobindo's philosophy and vision

Nadkarni was born in Kodibag and raised in Bankikkodla. At Bankikodla, literature, folk art, spiritual lore, music and sports kept him enthralled during his school days. Mangesh completed his high school diploma (1948–49) from the A. H. School, Bankikodla. His teachers in high school, including the renowned thinker and writer Gourish Kaikini, gave impetus to his imagination and taught him to perceive the sheer excitement of ideas, leading him to the path of his inner quest. Sundar Nadkarni a Karnataka Sahitya Akademi winner was Mangesh's younger brother.

Nadkarni completed his M.A. in English literature from Rajaram College, Kolhapur, and began his teaching career in Rajkot. Later, he moved to Anand where he was a lecturer of English at Nalini Arvind & T.V. Patel Arts College. During his college career, Nadkarni was a student of professor V.K. Gokak who influenced Nadkarni towards Sri Aurobindo's philosophy. Mangesh earned his Ph.D. in Phonetics from the UCLA, and was a professor of linguistics at the Central Institute of English and Foreign Languages, Hyderabad. He later taught as a senior lecturer at the National University of Singapore (1985–93). During the course of his tenure, he guided Ph.D. candidates and published in theoretical and applied Linguistics journals.

== At Pondicherry ==
Nadkarni's interest in Sri Aurobindo and his writings were awakened when as a young man he came across the following utterance of Sri Aurobindo in a journal, "Heaven we have possessed, but not the earth; but the fullness of the Yoga is to make, in the formula of the veda, 'Heaven and Earth equal and one'"

The influence of Sri Aurobindo's philosophy on him was gradual, and he found it intellectually most liberating and satisfying. He was a Yogi on the path of continuous progress, and a renowned exponent of the Integral Yoga of Sri Aurobindo and the Mother. He lectured many times on Sri Aurobindo's philosophy and vision. The Kannada translation of Aurobindo's 'Future Poetry' - Bhavishya Kavya, translated by Gourish Kaikini was done on Nadkarni's invitation and remains the only known Kannada translation of the work till now. Nadkarni spoke brilliantly on ‘Savitri’, a 24,000-verse epic poem by Sri Aurobindo. The poem recounts the saga of human victory over ignorance and the conquest of death. Reading ‘Savitri’ is itself considered a practice of integral yoga and a potent vehicle of aspiration. Nadkarni inculcated ‘Savitri’ as a mantra in his life.

== Selected work ==
- Beyond Liberalism 'Humanism and Technological Trans-humanism.' - a monograph
- 'Some thoughts on taking Sri Aurobindo to the youth'. - a monograph
- A Brief Introduction to Savitri - a monograph. - a monograph
- Problems of Human Unity in Sri Aurobindo's Light - a monograph.
- Hindu-Muslim Unity in Sri Aurobindo's Light - a monograph.
- A set of sixteen audio-cassettes containing talks given by him on Savitri at the Sri Aurobindo Ashram have been published.
- India's Spiritual Destiny - Its Inevitability and Potentiality
- "Bilingualism and syntactic change in Konkani" published in - Language, 1975 - (a major journal included in JSTOR) has 86 citations.

== See also ==
- A journey on The Sunlit Path - A collection of tributes to Nadkarni (Publisher Mirravision Trust, Pondicheri- 605003, India.), 2008.
