= Aigalkurve =

Coordinates: 14°29′N 74°24′E

- village
- Aigalkurve is in Uttara Kannada district
- Interactive map of Aigalkurve
- Country: India
- State: Karnataka
- District: Uttara Kannada
- Talukas: Kumta

Government
  - Body: Village Panchayat

Languages
  - Official: Kannada
- Time zone: UTC+5:30 (IST)
- Nearest cities: Karwar, Mangalore
- Civic agency: Village Panchayat

Aigalkurve is a village in the southern state of Karnataka, India. It is located in the Kumta taluk of Uttara Kannada district in Karnataka.

== See also ==
- Uttara Kannada
- Mangalore
- Ankola
- Districts of Karnataka
