= S. R. Ekkundi =

Indian poet (1923–1995)

Subbanna Ranganath Ekkundi
- Born: Subbanna Ranganath Ekkundi; 20 January 1923; Ranebennur, Haveri district, Karnataka
- Died: 20 August 1995 (aged 72); Bangalore, Karnataka, India
- Occupation: High school teacher
- Spouse: Indira Ekkundi
- Writing career
- Pen name: ಸು.ರಂ.ಎಕ್ಕುಂಡಿ
- Period: 1945–1995
- Genre: Kannada poetry
- Subject: Various themes
- Notable awards: Sahitya Akademi Award, Best Teacher National Award and Soviet Land Award.

Subbanna R. Ekkundi (1923–1995) was a recipient of Sahitya Akademi Award, National Award for Teacher and Soviet Land Award.

Ekkundi was born in Ranebennur of Haveri district in the year 1923. His father was Ranganath and mother was Rajakka. He was a student of literature at Willingdon college, Sangli. At Willingdon, V. K. Gokak and R. S. Mugali were Ekkundi's professors. Ekkundi and Gangadhar V. Chittal from Hanehalli were classmates at Willingdon. After graduating with B.A. (Hons.) Literature in the year 1944, Subbanna Ekkundi joined the Anandashram High School, Bankikodla as a teacher and retired as Head Master of that institute in 1977. Ekkundi was married to Indira Ekkundi from Haveri.

In 1992, Ekkundi was awarded the Sahitya Akademi and the Karnataka Sahitya Akademi awards for his outstanding poetical work Bakulada Hoovugalu in Kannada. His poem Ladhak Irali Nepa Irali which was written during the Second Indo-China war was well received. His political sympathies were with the Communist party. After his retirement, he was given a national award for teaching. He was the author of many works of poetry and short stories. His work is described by an entry in the Encyclopaedia of Indian Literature Besides politics, his poetry deals primarily with traditional Indian mythological and religious themes. His Ubhaya Bharati concerns the famous debate between the Hindu philosophers Adi Shankara and Mandana Mishra.

In 1970, Ekkundi was given award from the Land of the Soviets. Kannada University at Hampi conferred a PhD degree to a student on a thesis entitled S. R. Ekkundi....

An anthology of his complete poems was released in the year 2008 in a book titled Bellaki Hindu.

== Collection of poems ==
- Matsyagandhi (1975)
- Bakulada Hoovugalu (1991)
- Ubhaya Bharati
- Subhadra
- Ananda Teertha
- Mithile
- Kathan Kavanagalu
- Havadigara Huduga
- Bellakkigalu
- Santana
- Godhiya Tenegalu
- Parivallagalu
- Bellakki Hindu (an anthology of complete poems)

== Other work ==
- Neralu (Collection of Short Stories)
- Eradu Russian Kadambrigalu – Translated from Russian to English to Kannada (fiction)
- Panjugalu

== Awards ==
- Kendra Sahitya Akademi Award for Bakulada Hoovugalu
- Karnataka Sahitya Akademi Award for Bakulada Hoovugalu
- Karnataka Sahitya Akademi Honorary Award for Lifetime Achievement
- Best Teacher Award
- Vardhamana Award
