= Nadkarni =

Nadkarni is a surname commonly found in the Indian states of Maharashtra, Goa and Karnataka. Notable people with the surname include:

- Bapu Nadkarni (1933–2020), Indian cricketer
- Dayanand S. Nadkarni (1910–2000), Indian politician
- Jayant Ganpat Nadkarni (1931–2018), Admiral in Indian Navy, 14th Chief of the Naval staff
- M. G. Nadkarni, Indian mathematician
- Nalini Nadkarni (born 1954), American ecologist
- Sucheta Nadkarni (1967–2019), academic in the field of management
- Sundar Rao Nadkarni, Indian film actor
- Sushil Nadkarni (born 1976), American cricketer
- Anuradha Paudwal a.k.a. Alka Nadkarni (born 1954), Indian playback singer
