= Gibb High School, Kumta =

Coordinates: 14°25′29.97″N 74°24′57.97″E

- Kumta, Karnataka; India

Information
- Former name: New English School, Kumta
- Established: 1908; 117 years ago

Gibb High School, Kumta, is an independent secondary school in Karnataka, India.

== History ==
It is one of the oldest high schools in Uttar Kannada district. The school was established on 4 June 1908. It was initially named New English School, Kumta to distinguish it from the then existing Kumta Municipal, A.V. School.

The school was renamed as Gibb High School as a token of gratitude to M.C. Gibb, the Commissioner of Southern Division for his help in getting recognition and bringing this school under grant-in-aid in 1911. Accommodating 100 students, a hostel called Pandit Hostel for the pupils was constructed later.

The Golden Jubilee was celebrated in 1959 and the Centenary was celebrated on 19, 20 and 21 December 2009. The Golden Jubilee was celebrated under the presidency of Rajendra Prasad, the first President of India. To mark the Golden Jubilee Celebration, an auditorium was constructed in the name of Rajendra Prasad.

== Former headmasters ==
- A. S. Kamat
- V. G. Bhat
- G.S.BHAT
- B. G Pai
- Vasudev Mhapsekar
- S. P. Shanbhag
- D. G. Shastri

== Headmaster ==
Smt. Mahamaya Kamat

== Notable alumni ==
- Tonse Madhav Ananth Pai, a banker, who received the Padma Bhushan in 1972.
- Yashwant Chittal
- Gangadhar V. Chittal
- Gopalkrishna P. Nayak
- Pallavi Subhash Chandran
