= Gokhale Centenary College =

College of Karnataka University Dharwad

Coordinates: 14°39′19.97″N 74°18′55.47″E

Gokhale Centenary College Vandige is affiliated to Karnataka University Dharwad. This college offers pre-university, B.A., B.Com. and B.Sc. degrees. This college was established in 1966 by Dinakara Desai. It is the first college of the Kanara Welfare Trust while the trust is managing many high schools, primary schools and other institutions in Uttar Kannada district.

Situated on the national highway NH66, Gokhale Centenary College has brought college education to thousands of young people coming from the backward classes of Ankola town and its outskirts. Prof. K. G. Naik was its founding principal.

== Former principals ==
- K. G. Naik (1966–1990)
- A. H. Nayak (1990–1993)
- V. A. Joshi (1994-2000)
- V. R. Vernekar (June 2000-31 June 2004)
- N. L. Nayak (July 2004–June 2008)
- R. G. Gundi (July 2008–September 2008)
- V. R. Kamat (October 2008– )
- Dr. Imthyaz Ahmed Khan(Present)

== See also ==
- Education in India
- Literacy in India
