= Bhavikeri =

- village
- Country: India
- State: Karnataka
- District: Uttara Kannada
- Talukas: Ankola

Population (2001)
  - Total: 7,816

Languages
  - Official: Kannada
- Time zone: UTC+5:30 (IST)

Bhavikeri is a village in the southern state of Karnataka, India. It is located in the Ankola taluk of Uttara Kannada district in Karnataka.

== Demographics ==
As of 2001 India census, Bhavikeri had a population of 7816 with 3927 males and 3889 females. Bhavikeri village main communities are Nadavaru, Komarapant, Ager, Halakki Vokkaliga, Harikant etc.

Bhavikeri village panchayat is largest panchayat in Ankola.

== See also ==
- Uttara Kannada
- Districts of Karnataka
