= Sanikatta =

- Village
- Location in Karnataka, India Sanikatta (India)
- Coordinates: 14.56°N 74.31667°E
- Country: India
- State: Karnataka
- District: Uttara Kannada
- Elevation: 586 m (1,923 ft)

Languages
  - Official: Kannada
- Time zone: UTC+5:30 (IST)

Sanikatta is a twin village (combined with Talgeri) in Kumta taluk of Uttara Kannada district, Karnataka, India. This place is about a few square kilometres in extent. It is in the neighborhood of Gokarna, Devarbhavi, Torke, Moodangi and Tadadi port. The place Sanikatta is the oldest salt-manufacturing village in the Karnataka State. Beginning from 1720, Sanikatta has continued manufacturing salt for nearly 300 years.

== Climate ==
The village is a west coastal lowland and forms part of the Western Ghats. It is characterized by high temperatures throughout the year. The rainfall here is seasonal, but heavy and is about 350 cm a year. Most of the rain is received in the period from June to November, mainly through South-west Monsoon. This suits paddy cultivation and is adequate for the growth of vegetation during the entire year. December to May is the dry months with very little rainfall which helps in Salt production. The "Naranapur" gazani is one of the famous gazani (Creek land) for salt production.

== High school ==
- Shri Sadguru Nityanand High-School
- Shri Sadguru Nityanand High-School

== See also ==
- Karwar
- Mangalore
