= Subbanna (disambiguation) =

Subbanna is a Kannada Brahmin surname or given name that can refer to a number of people:

- K. V. Subbanna, a writer and playwright in Kannada language.
- Shimoga Subbanna, a music singer from Karnataka
- Subbanna Ekkundi, a Kannada language poet
