= N. H. Gouda =

Indian politician

Narayan H. Gouda

Personal details
- Born: 1938 Gonehalli
- Died: 1992 (aged 53–54) Kumta
- Occupation: Member of the Legislative Assembly (India), Teacher

Narayan Holiyappa Gouda (1938–1992) was a M.L.A to the Karnataka state Legislative Assembly, Bangalore from 1985 to 1989. He was elected from the Janata Dal. At that time Ramakrishna Hegde from the Janata party was the Chief Minister of Karnataka.
