= Gopal Gaonkar =

Indian academic

G. H. Gaonkar
- Born: 1936 (age 89–90); India
- Citizenship: United States
- Education: Washington University in St. Louis; Veermata Jijabai Technological Institute; KLE Technological University
- Occupation: Professor of Engineering
- Known for: Helicopter dynamics, floquet theory, parallel computing
- Spouses: Ann Gaonkar
- Awards: 2005 American Helicopter Society's Fellow Award
- Scientific career
- Fields: Helicopter Engineering
- Workplaces: Florida Atlantic University; Indian Institute of Science; Southern Illinois University Edwardsville; Washington University in St. Louis

Gopal H. Gaonkar (born 1936) is a professor of engineering at Florida Atlantic University. Gaonkar is a recipient of American Helicopter Society's Fellow Award in 2005, was the Editor-in-Chief of the Journal of the American Helicopter Society, and a member of the AHS Technical Council.

Born and raised in Hanehalli village, Gaonkar completed his high school (1955) from the Anandashram High School, Bankikodla. Gaonkar earned a B.E. degree (1960) in Civil Engineering from B.V.B. College of Engineering & Technology (Now known as KLE Technological University), Hubli a M.E. degree (1963) in Civil Engineering from VJTI, Mumbai and a D.Sc. degree (1967) in Helicopter Engineering from the McKelvey School of Engineering at Washington University in St. Louis.

Prior to joining FAU, Gaonkar was a research professor at Southern Illinois University Edwardsville and a professor of Aerospace Engineering at the Indian Institute of Science, Bangalore. His research interests are in Helicopter dynamics, Floquet theory and Large-Scale and parallel computing.

During the year 2009–2010, Gaonkar was a visiting professor at Washington University in St. Louis, his alma mater. He is married to Anasuya Gaonkar, and has two children. He has six grandchildren.

== Sources ==
- The Smithsonian/NASA Astrophysics Data System
- How to Modify a Helicopter... without a Helicopter
- Listing of AHS Technical Fellow Award
