= H. R. Manjanath =

Indian politician

H. R. Manjanath was a Member of the legislative assembly (1967–1971) from Kumta constituency to the Karnataka state, Bangalore.
