= Sundar V. Nadkarni =

Sundar Vithal Nadkarni
- Born: 1938; Bankikodla-Hanehalli, Karwar, Uttar Kannada, Karnataka, British Raj
- Died: 1994 (aged 55–56); Anand, Gujarat, India
- Occupations: Professor, Writer, Poet
- Writing career
- Subjects: English, Kannada
- Notable awards: Karnataka Sahitya Academy award

Sundar V. Nadkarni (1938–1994) was a Kannada poet, writer and professor, who was awarded Karnataka Sahitya Akademi for the fiction 'Mandi Mane'. He was a younger brother of Mangesh V. Nadkarni.

Sundar V. Nadkarni was born and raised in Bankikkodla, a village in coastal India. Sundar earned his high school diploma (1955) from the A. H. School a school from his village. Nadkarni was a Professor of English in Arts and Science College, Anand, Gujarat. Later in the year 1985, he earned a Ph.D in English from the Department of English, Sardar Patel University. "[Citation needed]"

== Selected books ==
- Manthan
- Hasiru Deep
- Usirugal Beediyali
- Antard Neeru
- Negasu
- Mohitaru
- Godegalu
- Avar Naduve
- Suddi
- Mandi Mane (Karnataka state Sahitya Akademi award)
