= Appemidi Mango =

Mango cultivar from Karnataka, India

Mangifera 'Appemidi'
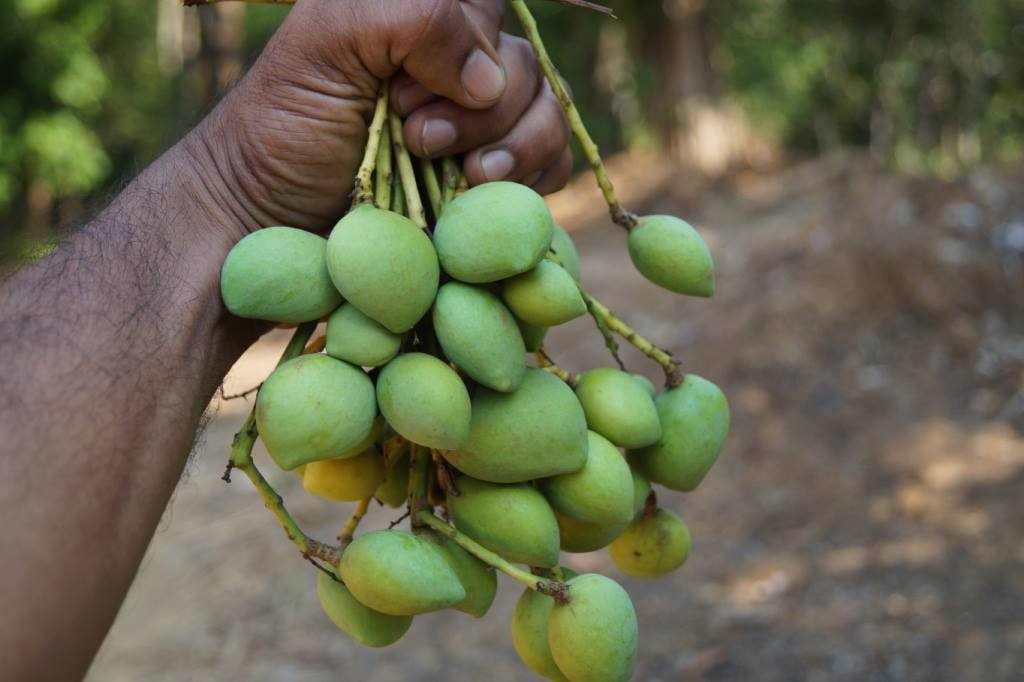
- Genus: Mangifera
- Species: Mangifera indica
- Cultivar: 'Appemidi'
- Origin: India

The 'Appemidi' mango, is a mango cultivar primarily grown in Malenadu region of Karnataka, India. Appe midi is the variation of the same name. Appemidi varieties include Ananta Bhattana, Kanchappa, and Karnakundala.

== Name ==
The word "Appe midi", translating to "Tender Mango" in the Kannada language, is the king of all tender mangoes for its use in the South Asian pickle industry. Appemidi mangoes, grown along the riverbeds of the Aghanashini, Bedti, and Sharavati, are celebrated for their exceptional suitability in making mouthwatering pickles known popularly as 'Appe midi Uppinakayi'.

== Description ==
The mango is found in the wild and is small in size and pulpy. It is known for its taste, aroma and shelf life.

== Geographical indication ==
It was awarded the Geographical Indication status tag from the Geographical Indications Registry under the Union Government of India on 4 September 2009 (valid until 3 September 2029).

Department of Horticulture from Bengaluru proposed the GI registration of the Appemidi mango. After filing the application in 2009, the fruit was granted the GI tag in 2009 by the Geographical Indication Registry in Chennai, making the name "Appemidi" exclusive to the mangoes grown in the region. It thus became the first mango variety in Karnataka (before Kari Ishad mango) to earn the GI tag.

== See also ==
- List of mango cultivars
- List of Geographical Indications in India
