= Halkar =

Village in Kumta Taluk, Uttara Kannada, Karnataka, India

Coordinates: 14°26′44″N 74°24′22″E

Halkar is a village in Kumta Taluk, Uttara Kannada, Karnataka, India.

== Demographics ==
In the 2011 census its population was 1079. Halkar Local Language is Kannada. Halkar Village Total population is 1079 and number of houses are 262. Female Population is 47.5%. Village literacy rate is 74.6% and the Female Literacy rate is 32.3%.
