= R. S. Mugali =

Indian writer (1906–1992)

Ram Shri Mugali
- Born: 15 July 1906; Hole Alur, Gadag district, Karnataka
- Died: 10 February 1993; Bengaluru, Karnataka
- Occupations: Professor, writer
- Writing career
- Pen name: Rasika Ranga
- Genre: Fiction
- Notable awards: Sahitya Akademi award

Ram Shri Mugali (Ranganatha Srinivasa Mugali) (15 July 1906 – 20 February 1993) was a Kannada language writer. He was awarded the central Sahitya Akademi in 1956 for his work "Kannada Sahitya Charitre". He was the president of the 44th Kannada Sahitya Sammelana held in Siddganga, in the Tumkur district of Karnataka state, India.

== Early life ==
Mugali was born in a Deshastha Madhva Brahmin family in Hole Alur in the Ron Taluk of Gadag district, British India. In 1933, he was appointed professor of Kannada at Willingdon College, Sangli. Among his students at Willingdon were writers Subbanna Ekkundi and Gangadhar V. Chittal. In 1966, Mugali retired as a principal of the Willingdon College. From 1967 to 1970, he worked as the Head of the Kannada Department at the Bangalore University, Bangalore. Mugali died in Bangalore on 20 February 1992.

== Works ==
- Kannada Sahitya Charitre
- Kannada Sahitya Charitre - Aadhunika Kannada Sahitya Charitre Sahita
- Kannada Sahitya Vimarsheya Thatvika Vivechane
- Bendre Kavya
- Sahityopasane
- Sri Sri Aravinda Makaranda
- Punarnavodaya Mattu Sahityopasane
- Pracheen Kannada Sahitya Roopagalu
- Kannada Kavya Sanchaya
- Sri Aravindara Savitri
- Agnivarna
- Nava Manava
- Basiga
- Apr Karune
- Om Shanthi
- Kaarana Purasha Mattu Baaluri
- Anna
- Dhanajaya
- Ettida Kai
- Rannana Kriti Ratna
- Kannadada Kare
- Matembudu Jyotirlinga
