= Belambar =

- Village in Ankola Taluk
- Location in Uttara Kannada, Karnataka, India
- Coordinates: 14.633316°N 74.290399°E
- Country: India
- State: Karnataka
- District: Uttara Kannada
- Taluk: Ankola

Government
  - Body: Village Panchayat

Languages
  - Official: Kannada
- Time zone: UTC+5:30 (IST)
- PIN: 581 353
- Vehicle registration: KA-30

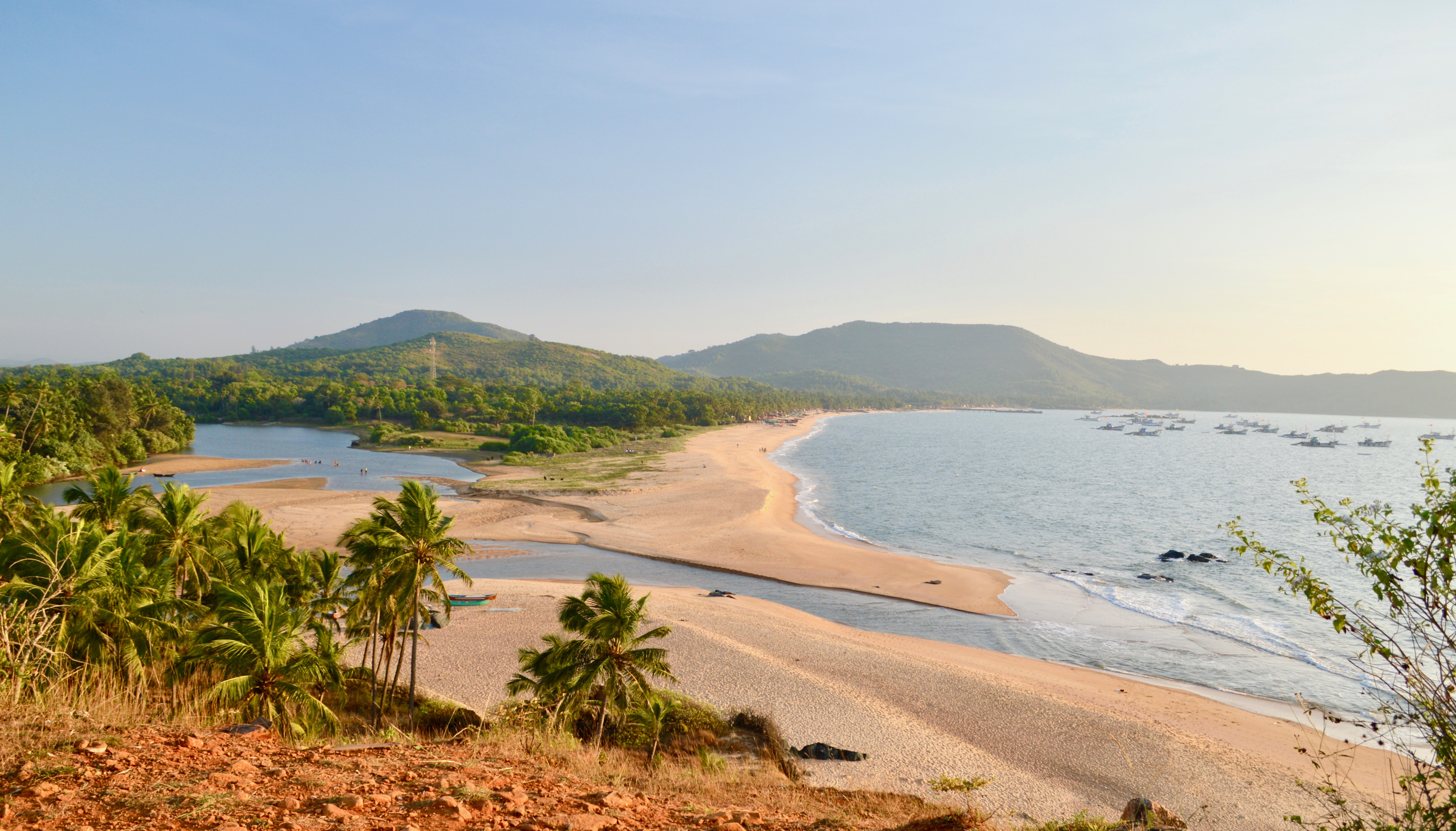
Poojageri River & Belambar Beach

Belambar is a village in Ankola, in Uttara Kannada district of Karnataka state, India. It is bounded by the Arabian Sea to its west and by the Western Ghats to its east The Village's topography consists of a plain that stretches up to 2.5 km from the coast. As of the 2011 India Census, Belambar had a population of 4983 people; with 2539 of those male and 2444 female.

Belambar is a multi-lingual village where prominent regional languages such as Kannada, Konkani are spoken. Hinduism is the largest religion in Belambar, and Halakki Gouda, Naik, Nadavaru, Brahmins, Shetty, Goud Saraswat Brahmins (GSBs), are the major communities among Hindus. Majourly found caste is Halakki Vokkaligas.

The Halakki Vokkaliga are a sub caste group of vokkaligas of Karnataka, India. They are found predominantly in Uttara Kannada district. Halakki Vokkaligas living in the foot of Western Ghats are known as the "Aboriginals of Uttara Kannada". Their way of living is still ancient. The women adorn themselves with beads and necklaces, heavy nose rings and distinctive attire. Halakki speak a different dialect of Kannada called as Halakki Kannada.

== Climate ==
It receives about 95 per cent of its total annual rainfall between May and October but remains extremely dry from December to March. Humidity is approximately 75 per cent on average and peaks during June, July and August. The maximum average humidity is 93 per cent in July and average minimum humidity is 56 per cent in January. The driest and least humid months are from December to February.

Belambar is surrounded by temples, schools, paddy fields and mango groves. It is located on the coast of the Arabian sea and has natural beaches.

== Culture ==
Folk Dance: A popular folk dance in belambar is Suggi kunitha a local seasonal folk dance. The troupes of the Suggi dancers move from one village to another during the paddy harvest season until the festival of "Holi" to perform the dance as a gratitude to the God for the successful harvest.

Festivals: An annual mela called Bandihabba is celebrated in the month of May. Also Hanuman jayanthi.

== Temples ==
Belambar houses many temples such as famous Shri Mahasati Temple, Maruti Temple, Shri Ganapati Temple, Allaki,

== Cuisine ==
Usual diet contains boiled white rice (called Kuchige akki) and fish, basale soppina Saru in Kannada language (a vegetable sambar) & Nati Koli Saaru (chicken curry). Fish is consumed by a large part of population. Special Preparations. Kotte Roti - A form of idlilike preparation, steam cooked in a conical shaped container constructed using jackfruit leaves.

== Transportation ==
Public road transportation to Ankola is handled by NWKRTC (North West Karnataka Road Transport Corporation ) .Road transportation is a crucial link for the population. Other modes of transportation such as inland water navigation, are also in use. Railway station is about 12 km from the Belambar.

== Schools and colleges ==
The Belambar has a government, government aided and private educational institutions.
