= Manjaguni =

Village in Karnataka, India

Manjaguni is a village in Ankola taluk, Uttara Kannada district, Karnataka state, India.
