= Kari Ishad =

Mango cultivar from Karnataka, India

Mangifera 'Kari Ishad'
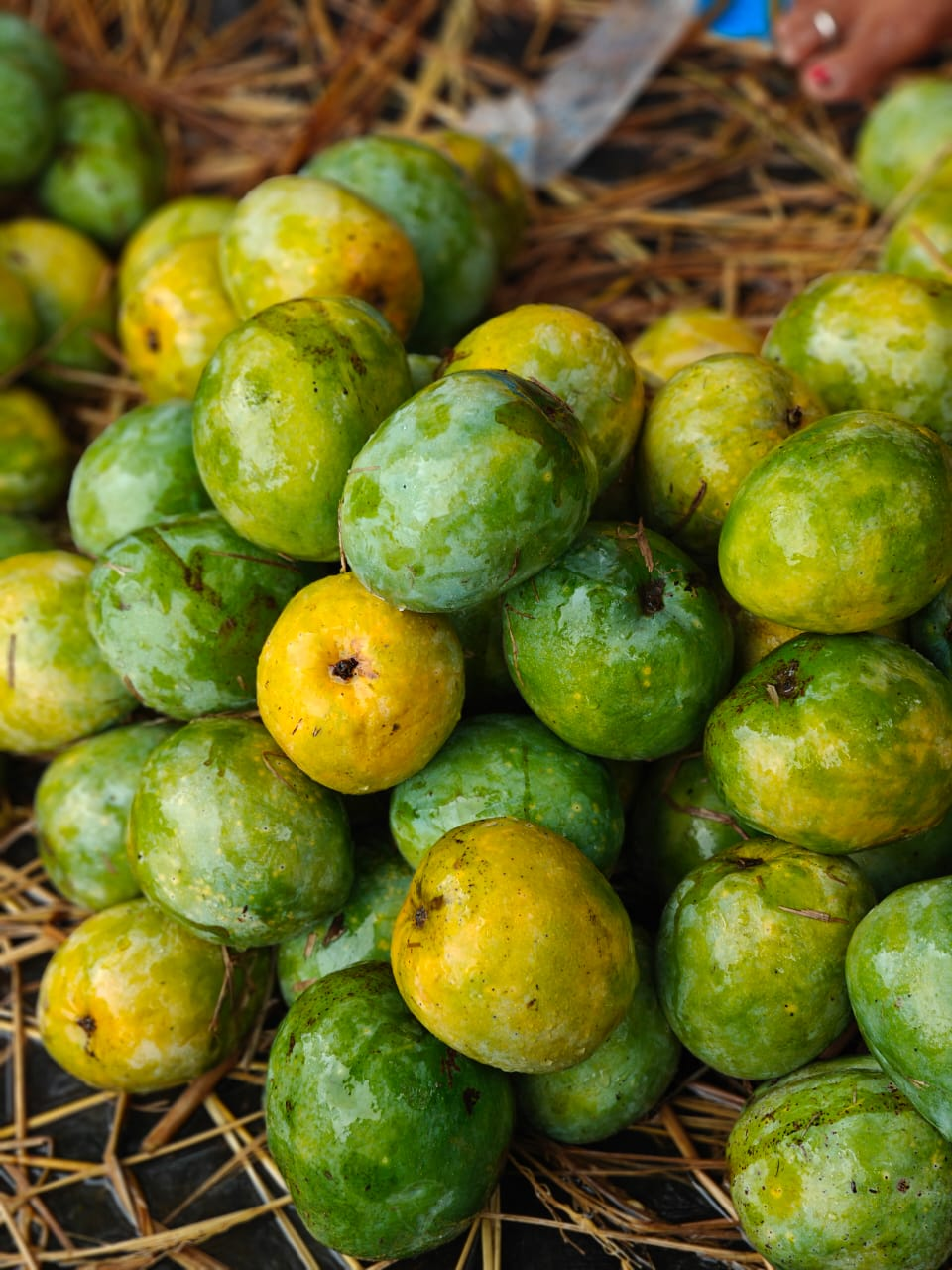
- Kari Ishad mango
- Genus: Mangifera
- Species: Mangifera indica
- Cultivar: 'Kari Ishad'
- Origin: India

The Kari Ishad is a mango cultivar primarily grown in the Ankola and Karwar talukas of Uttara Kannada district, Karnataka, India.

== Description ==
The mango breed is well known for its luscious taste, unique aroma, generous amount of pulp, shape, and size. Ishad mango has two varieties, Kari Ishad (thin skin) and Bili lshad (thick skin but with less pulp and is less sweet). Kari Ishad mangoes are characterized by their impressive size and shape typically growing large and assuming an oblique-oval shape. A mature tree can yield up to 2000 fruits in a single season. The mango is harvested from mid-May with a short shelf life of about five days. Its market is limited to Ankola, Karwar and Hubballi.

== Geographical indication ==
It was awarded the Geographical Indication (GI) status tag from the Geographical Indications Registry under the Union Government of India on 31 March 2023 (valid until 1 March 2032).

Matha Totagars Farmer Producer Company Limited from Ankola proposed the GI registration of the Kari Ishad mango. After filing the application in 2022, the fruit was granted the GI tag in 2023 by the Geographical Indication Registry in Chennai, making the name "Kari Ishad" exclusive to the mangoes grown in the region. It thus became the second mango variety in Karnataka (after Appemidi Mango) to earn a GI tag.

== See also ==
- List of mango cultivars
- List of Geographical Indications in India
