= Hegde (village) =

- Village
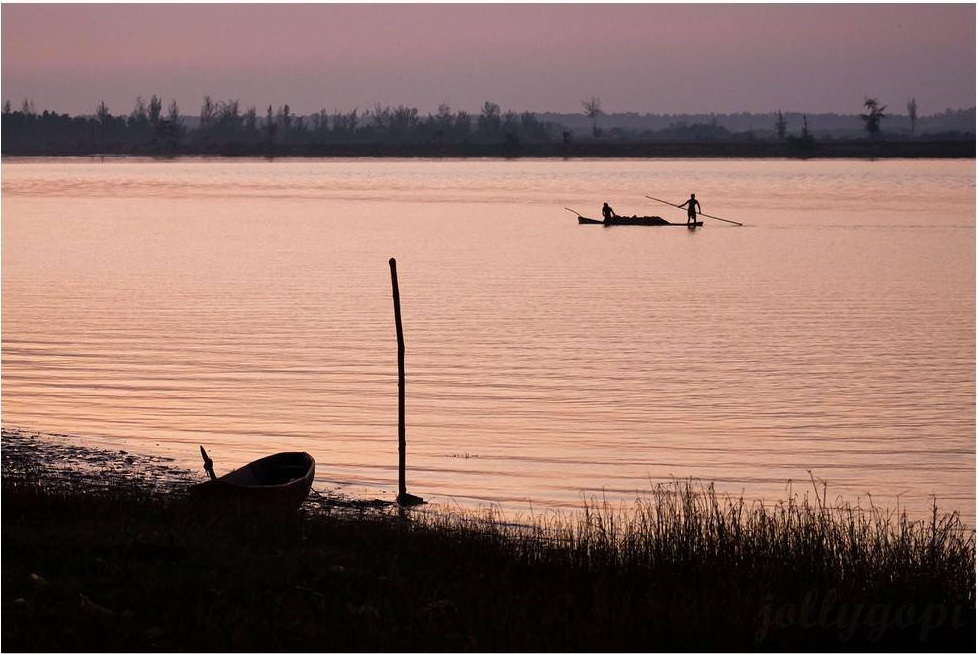

- Location in Karnataka, India Hegde (India)
- Coordinates: 14°27′53″N 74°25′20″E
- Country: India
- State: Karnataka
- District: Uttara Kannada district

Population (2011)
  - Total: 6,918

Languages
  - Official: Kannada
- Time zone: UTC+5:30 (IST)
- PIN: 581 330
- Telephone code: 91-(0)8386
- Vehicle registration: KA-47

Hegde is a village in Kumta on the western coast of India in the Uttara Kannada district of the state of Karnataka.

== Location ==
Hegde is 4 km away from National Highway 17, which runs from Mumbai to Thiruvananthapuram. Distances to some of the major cities are:

- Bangalore 470 km
- Dharwad 177 km
- Goa (Panaji) 179 km
- Mangalore 204 km
- Mumbai 738 km
- Pune 598 km
- Bhatkal 60 km
- Honnavar 25 km

On the Konkan Railway line, the nearest railway station is Kumta. Autorickshaws, buses and other modes of road transport are available to reach Hegde from the railway station. The nearest international airports are Goa (180 km) Mangalore (207 km).

== Climate ==
This part of Karnataka has very hot Summer with temperature rising of maximum of 35-36 degree Celsius and the Rainfall here is seasonal, but heavy and is above 6000 mm. in a year. The impact of winter is less in this part of Coastal Karnataka. Since the city is located on the coast, it has an extreme climate, with temperatures in the range of 36^{0}C to 28^{0}C during summer and 26^{0}C to 20^{0}C during winter. The rainy season witnesses heavy rains by the South-West Monsoon.

The Monsoon period is from June to September with rainfall averaging more than 4000mm every year and heavy winds.

Climate data for Kumta
Month	Jan	Feb	Mar	Apr	May	Jun	Jul	Aug	Sep	Oct	Nov	Dec	Year
Mean daily maximum °C (°F)	32.8 (91.0)	33 (91)	33.5 (92.3)	34 (93)	33.3 (91.9)	29.7 (85.5)	28.2 (82.8)	28.4 (83.1)	29.5 (85.1)	30.9 (87.6)	32.3 (90.1)	32.8 (91.0)	31.5 (88.7)
Mean daily minimum °C (°F)	20.8 (69.4)	21.8 (71.2)	23.6 (74.5)	25 (77)	25.1 (77.2)	24.4 (75.9)	24.9 (76.8)	24 (75)	24.1 (75.4)	24.1 (75.4)	24.4 (75.9)	24.2 (75.6)	23.9 (74.9)
Average precipitation mm (inches)	1.1 (0.04)	0.2 (0.01)	2.9 (0.11)	24.4 (0.96)	183.2 (7.21)	1,027.2 (40.44)	1,200.4 (47.26)	787.3 (31.00)	292.1 (11.50)	190.8 (7.51)	70.9 (2.79)	16.4 (0.65)	3,796.9 (149.48)

== Education ==
- MHPS Hegde,
- KGS Hegde,
- HPS Melinakeri
- HPS Masur
- Dr. A.V. Baliga College Of Arts & Science
- Kamala Baliga College Of Education
- Vidyadhiraj Polytechnic

== Religion ==
The main temple and deity is devi Shri Shantika Parameshwari. Hegde car festival is one of the major car fest in Karavali.

== See also ==
- Gokarna
- Kumta
