= Willingdon College =

College in Maharashtra, India

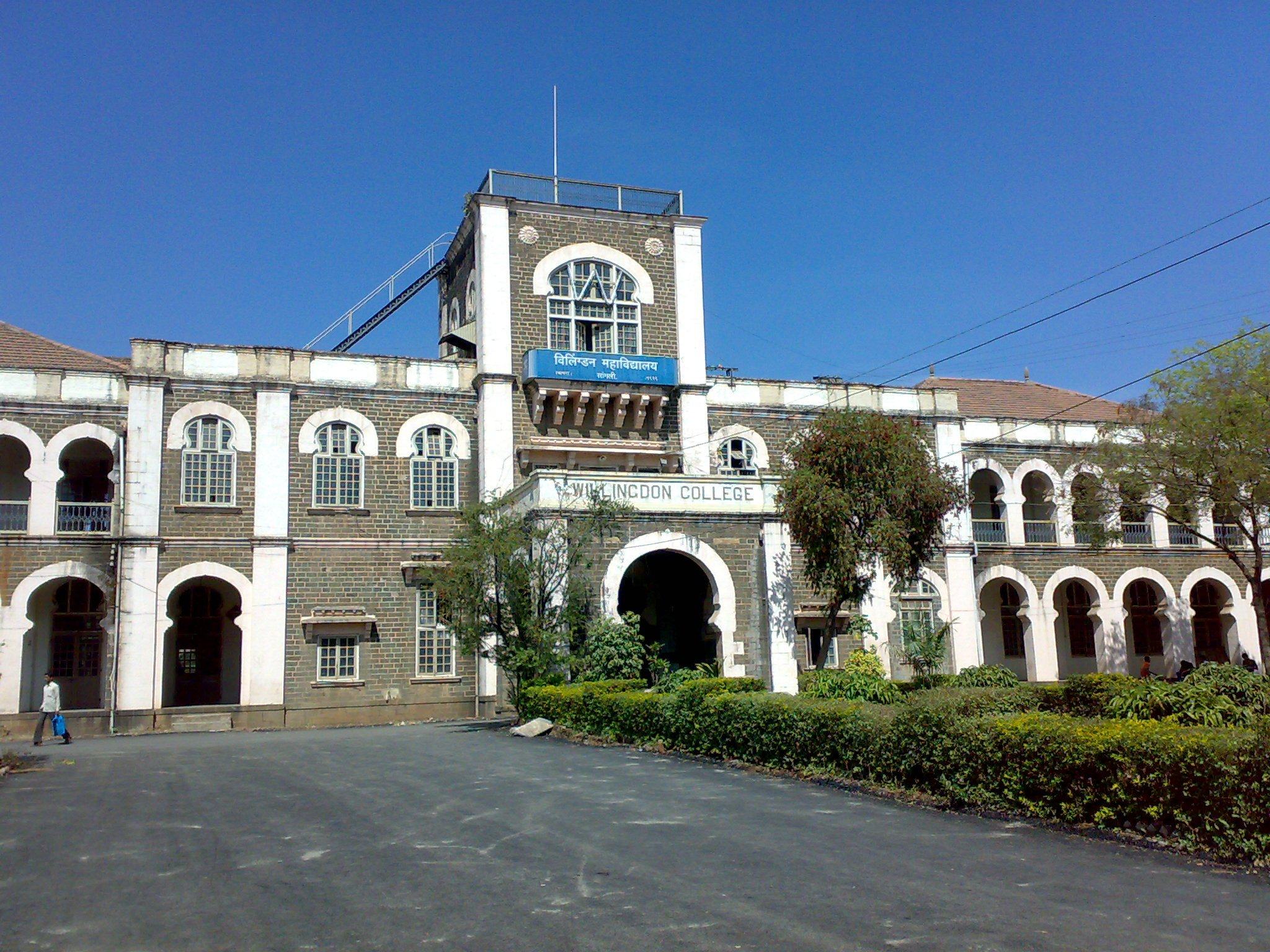
- Motto: Union is strength
- Established: 1919
- Affiliations: Shivaji University
- Principal: Dr. Bhaskar Vinayak Tamhankar
- Location: Sangli, Maharashtra, India; 16.8499°N 74.5999°E
- Website: willingdoncollege.ac.in

Willingdon College is a college in Sangli, in the Vishrambag area of the Sangli–Miraj–Kupwad Municipal Corporation, between the twin cities of Sangli and Miraj in Maharashtra, India. The college was established in 1919 and was named after the former Governor of Bombay, Lord Willingdon. It provides access to higher education for students from southern Maharashtra and the districts of Belagavi, Dharwad, Karwar, and Bijapur.

== History ==
=== Establishment ===
==== 1919 ====
The Deccan Education Society, founded in 1884 by Bal Gangadhar Tilak and Gopal Ganesh Agarkar, established Willingdon College in 1919. The institution was founded with the support of Shahu Maharaj and the rulers of the Sangli and Miraj states to provide higher education in southern Maharashtra. Inaugurated on 22 June 1919, the college was named after the Governor of Bombay, Lord Willingdon.

The college initially operated at the site of the Rani Saraswati Kanya Shala with an enrollment of 220 students in the Arts wing. Founding Principal C.G. Bhatye and Wrangler R.P. Paranjapye later secured 125 acres (0.51 km²) at Vishrambag, where the permanent campus was constructed.

=== Silver jubilee ===
==== 1944 ====
During this period, centres of higher education and colleges were rare. Students in southern Maharashtra and from the districts of Belgaum, Dharwad, Karwar, and Vijapur in Karnataka benefited from the establishment of the college. The college moved into its current buildings on 8 August 1924. At the time, only the L-shaped wing to the east and the south had been completed. The square block building of the Boys' Hostel was completed in 1925, and the two-storey Shahu Block in 1927. In 1932–33, the Science wing was started. Between 1935 and 1944, the Gymkhana building, residential quarters for professors on either side of the approach road, the Girls' Hostel, the Guest House (Karve Sadan), and a laboratory were constructed. In 1944, the college marked its silver jubilee.

=== Golden jubilee ===
==== 1969 ====
Following the silver jubilee celebrations, additional infrastructure was developed on the campus. Between 1945 and 1957, more hostels for girls, two more hostel buildings for boys, Velankar Assembly Hall, a recreation hall, and an extension to the western building of the main building were constructed. The hostels currently accommodate 110 boys and 85 girls.

Over the next fifteen years, the Biology Laboratory, a three-storey library building, a post office building, an additional girls' hostel, a canteen, National Cadet Corps (NCC) buildings, and an open-air theatre were completed. In the Science faculty, subjects including biology, physics, mathematics, and statistics were introduced.

=== Diamond jubilee ===
==== 1979 ====
Funds collected during the Golden Jubilee were utilised for further development. Eleven new classrooms, a teachers' hostel (constructed with grants from the University Grants Commission covering approximately two-thirds of the total expenditure), a tube well for water supply, an extension to the Gymkhana Building, and a badminton hall were completed.

The college was recognised as a permanent postgraduate center by Shivaji University. In the Science faculty, microbiology and electronics were introduced to the college. In the Arts faculty, psychology, logic, and philosophy were added.

=== Platinum jubilee ===
==== 1994 ====
As part of the Platinum Jubilee celebrations, several projects were initiated. These included the establishment of pre-primary, primary, and secondary schools (in English and Marathi mediums) on the Willingdon campus, as well as the construction of a health club and an overhead water tank.

==== 2011 ====
In 2011, Willingdon College celebrated its platinum jubilee, commemorating 75 years since its establishment. The celebrations featured academic and cultural programmes on campus, along with initiatives to enhance campus facilities and engage students, faculty, and alumni.

== Infrastructure ==
=== Main building ===
The main building of Willingdon College is a quadrangular stone structure that forms the central part of the campus. It houses various administrative offices, classrooms, and other academic facilities. An open-air theatre is located within the quadrangle, providing space for cultural and educational events. The building is a notable example of early 20th-century institutional architecture in the region.

==== Building comprises ====
The main building of Willingdon College consists of multiple floors with academic and administrative facilities.

Basement – The basement contains four medium-sized rooms, including one used as a control room for university examinations, and a storeroom.

Ground Floor – This floor houses the offices of the Principal and Vice-Principal, the Administrative Office, the Geography Department, the Staff Common Room, the Ladies’ Common Room, and the library. It also includes the Departments of Botany and Mathematics, the NCC office with a separate entrance, three large classrooms, one small classroom, and a strongroom for the university’s Central Assessment Programme. An open-air theatre is located on this floor and is used for the annual prize distribution ceremony.

First Floor – The first floor accommodates seven large rooms and one medium-sized room, which are used by the Departments of History, Statistics, Hindi, English, Marathi, Economics, Physics, and Zoology.

Terrace – On the front side of the terrace is a tower where the National Flag is hoisted annually on 15 August, 26 January, and 1 May. The Zoology storeroom and the Animal House are located on the north-west side of the terrace.

In total, the building contains 24 classrooms.

== Auditorium and departments ==
Applied Sciences Building – This building currently houses the Departments of Microbiology, Biotechnology, Computer Science, and BCS.

Velankar Auditorium

=== Science Departments ===
- Department of Microbiology
- Department of Biotechnology
- Department of Mathematics
- Department of Physics
- Department of Chemistry
- Department of Statistics
- Department of Zoology
- Department of Botany
- Department of Electronics

=== Arts Departments ===
- Department of English
- Department of Marathi
- Department of Hindi
- Department of History
- Department of Economics
- Department of Sanskrit

Gymkhana and Pavilion Building – Facilities for sports and physical activities.

=== Chemistry Laboratory ===
- Chemist Laboratory No. 1
- Chemist Laboratory No. 2
- Chemist Laboratory No. 3

=== Other Buildings ===
- N.C.C. Armoury
- Residential Bungalows: Bungalow No. 1 (Principal's Residence), Bungalows No. 2–7 (for life-member teachers)
- Ladies' Hostel
- Boys' Hostel: Shahu Block, Square Block, Chavan Block, Kabbur Block
- Cycle stand, Hobby Workshop, Non-residential Students' Centre

== Willsoft ==
In 2010, the Computer Science Department began organising the competition event Willsoft. The event includes activities such as paper presentations, poster presentations, gaming competitions, and C programming contests, among others.

=== Year and No. of events occurred ===
Year	Score of events	Budget in Rs.
2010	6 (2 Days)	70,000
2011	7 (2 Days)	80,000
2012	5 (1 Day)	1,00,000
2013	5 (1 Day)	80,000

== Current principal ==
Dr. Bhaskar Vinayak Tamhankar (4 July 2014 – present)

== Current vice principals ==
1. Dr. Suresh R Kumbhar, Electronics Department (July 2019 – present)
2. Dr. Ravindra A Kulkarni, English Department (July 2019 – present)
3. Dr. Rajendra S Ponde, English Department (July 2019 – present)

== Former principals ==
- Govind Chimanaji Bhate
- K.G.Pandit
- Devdatta Dabholkar
- V. K. Gokak
- R. S. Mugali
- N. B. TARE
- M.D.Hatkanaglekar
- K.M.Agashe
- Dr. B.A.Patil
- S.S.Bodas
- Dr.Harishchandra Sidram Nirmale
- Dr.Pramila Lohoti
- Dr.Bhaskar V Tamhankar

== Notable students ==
- S. R. Ekkundi
- P. L. Deshpande
