= Dinakara Desai =

Indian politician and poet

- Born: 10 September 1909; Ankola (Uttara Kannada District), India
- Died: 6 November 1982 (aged 73); Mumbai
- Occupations: Poet, Writer, Educationist, Political and Social Activist.
- Writing career
- Genre: Poetryparty
- Movement: Chutukas

Dinakara Desai was a poet, writer, educationist, and political activist. He was famous for his poetry form called chutuka (also known as Chutuka Brahma). Chutuka or chutuku is a quadraplet poem. This format was later adopted by other poets. He made major contributions towards the literary development of the Uttara Kannada district of Karnataka.

== Biography ==
Early life

His grand parents were basically from Hondadahakkalu – Antarvalli (near Mirjan, Kumta taluka, Uttara Kannada district) and, were Konkani speaking people. Dinakar was the third child of Dattatray Desai (father) and Ambika (mother). He was born at Ankola (Uttara Kannada District) on 10 September 1909. He had two elder brothers – Yeshwant and Shankar; and, one younger sister – Saraswati. His mother died when Dinakar was 9 years old.

Education

Dinakar spent his early childhood at Alageri, a tiny village near Ankola where his father was working as Government Primary School Teacher. He had his primary education for four years in the same school where his father was working. Dinakar continued education at Edward High School (subsequently renamed as Jai Hind High School), Ankola. He completed Higher Secondary education by passing Matriculation at Government High School, Karwar (Headquarters of Uttara Kannada District). He joined Intermediate course in Bengaluru and continued degree course in Mysuru, completing B.A. in 1931 in First class. He won Candy Award. He moved to Mumbai to pursue Post Graducation course. He joined there at St. Xavier's College, where he completed M.A. in First class in 1933 by presenting a thesis - “Mahamandaleshwaras under the Chalukyas of Kalyani”. He had the guidance of famous History Professor Father Heras while preparing thesis. He won St. Xavier Silver Medal. While preparing for thesis for M.A. he was also attending Law college in Mumbai. He completed LLB in 1934.

=== Family ===
Marriage

Dinakar married Indira, daughter of Mahabaleshwar Wagle on 2 July 1936. He had convinced the elders about the need for its simplicity. The marriage was registered at Dharwad and a sum of Rs. 13 only was incurred towards marriage expenses. Dinakar was non-believer in God, but, had tolerated his wife worshipping. Dinakar had two daughters.

Death

Dinakar Desai had chronic diabetes; the health condition aggravated and he died at Mumbai on 6 November 1982.

== Career and activities ==
Desai initially intended to become a lawyer but was influenced by labour union activists M. N. Joshi and Thakkar Basha, who motivated him to contribute to the labour movement. He later became an associate to S. M. Joshi, reviewing the social issues that caused problems toward labourers. In this regard, he joined the Servants of India Society which was an organisation that was founded by Gopal Krishna Gokhale. The membership to this organisation was very stringent and the members were admitted only on an oath that they would serve the country without "expecting anything in return". His initiation to social activism was when he had to fight for the rights of the dock workers in Mumbai who were mainly Konkani people. Later, he also went to the Bijapur and Dharwad districts of Karnataka to assist in providing relief when a severe drought had set into those regions. He grew in stature and also held a position in the Mumbai City Corporation.

Later, Desai decided to focus on his native district of Uttara Kannada, where he began an "agitation against the landlords", which finally culminated in the law granting the land ownership to the person who tills the land. He later created the Kanara Welfare Trust in 1953. Under the aegis of this trust, various schools and colleges were founded in this district. He also started a Kannada language weekly Jansevaka in Ankola to create social and political awareness. One regular contributor was Gourish Kaikini.

Desai also had a career in politics and was once elected to the Parliament of India.

1 Social service::

After completing LLB, Dinakar had thought of legal practice. This thought did not last long. An advertisement from the Servants of India Society inviting applications for life membership changed the course of his life. He decided to devote life for social service and applied for the membership. He was selected and joined as member at Mumbai office of Servants of India Society in 1935. He shaped his career under the guidance of eminent socialist leader Sri S M Joshi; with dedication to service he served as life member and Head of the Mumbai Office of the Society.

Bijapur district of erstwhile Bombay Province faced famine during years 1936 to 1938 and 1940 to 1942. The Government on 8 December 1942 declared Bijapur as the famine affected district. Servants of India Society deputed Dinakar Desai to Bijapur district to assess the situation. Based on his comprehensive report, Servants of India Society constituted a Committee with Dinakar Desai as member-secretary. The Committee toured extensively in the District and was able to provide relief to the people affected by the famine.

2.Labour movement:

Dinakar Desai had concern for labourers and their suffering. He organized union of marine labourers at Bombay Port Trust. He founded the union in 1936 and served there up to 1962 - initially as Secretary and later as President of the Union. He resigned to the post of the Union with a view to concentrate on social work and education in his home district Uttara Kannada).

Dinakar Desai was active as member-secretary of Mumbai State Trade Union Congress for 10 years. When police resorted to firing at Textile Mill, Amalnar (Bombay Province) on 27 August 1946, Servants of India Society deputed Dinakar Desai to the Mill. After a detailed study he submitted a report.

When labour strike broke out in Gokak Textile Mills (Belgaum District), Servants of India Society deputed Dinakar Desai to assess the situation. He addressed the labour problems and succeeded in this regard.

Government of India deputed Dinakar Desai as member-secretary for the convention of the International Labour Organization held at Copenhagen, Denmark in November 1945. After attending the convention in Denmark, he visited England and studied problems being faced by the marine labourers.

Dinakar Desai represented India as one of the members to convention of the International Labour Organization held at Seattle, USA in 1946.

3 Farmers movement:

Dinakar Desai studied the problems of farmers, labourers, fishermen and agricultural workers in the district. He commenced farmers’ movement in the year 1937

Dinakar Desai organized taluka level rally of farmers at Ankola in March 1940; he also organised district level rally of farmers (ರೈತಕೂಟ) at Ankola in May 1940.

Uttara Kannada was backward district with 80 per cent of the area under forest and only 10 per cent of land fit for cultivation. The poor farmers and agricultural labourers did not own the land. As tenants they were required to pay huge amount of land rent, and, with poor returns were subjected to great suffering. The landlords in the district were naturally upset with the uprising of the farmers under the leadership of Dinakar Desai. They plotted and succeeded too. The British Government deported Dinakar Desai from Uttara Kannada district under Defence of India Rules for a period of 5 years from 1940 to 1945. Farmers’ agitation was continued even during his absence, and intensified after his return from deportation. As member of Servants of India Society, Dinakar Desai was busy throughout, and, he was providing guidance to the farmers’ agitation, besides visiting the district whenever necessary.

Gradually, relief started coming with the passing of Tenancy Act, 1946; and, Bombay Tenancy and Agricultural Land Act, 1956.

At a later period, when Shri Ramakrishna Hegde, the then Finance Minister of Karnataka State was visiting Kumta (along with Shri Dharmaveer, State Governor), Dinakar Desai took mass rally of farmers and urged upon him the need for regularization of forest land for cultivation purpose. This move yielded results as Ramakrishna Hegde agreed to regularize one lakh acre of forest land for cultivation purpose.

4 Educationist:

Kanara Welfare Trust:

Dinakar Desai founded Kanara Welfare Trust (KWT) in the year 1953 with headquarters at Ankola, with the objective of spreading education to the rural children by establishing educational institutions in Uttara Kannada District. The places chosen had no such facility for higher education previously. Initially High Schools were founded and the Pre-degree and Degree colleges followed at later stages. Besides educational institutions, the Trust (KWT) took care of the weaker section of the society by establishing Social Service Institutions like Tailoring Centres. The educational institutions were established by raising contributions from the philanthropists with whom Dinakar Desai had good contact. People's Multipurpose High School, Ankola established in the year 1953 was the first among the High Schools. Gokhale Centenary College, Ankola established in the year 1966 was the first among the Degree Colleges. The Trust (KWT) also subsequently established Divekar College of Commerce, Karwar in 1970 in the year 1970. The Trust (KWT) has at present 4 Degree Colleges, 6 Pre-Degree Colleges, 16 High Schools, 10 Primary and Pre-Primary Schools, and, 6 Other Social Service Institutions in the district.

5 Politics:

Dinakar Desai served as Corporator in Mumbai Municipal Corporation from 1948 to 1961.

Dinakar Desai contested unsuccessfully for the Parliament of India (Lok Sabha) in the General Elections, 1952 (Kanara Lok Sabha Constituency).

As a member of Servants of India Society he was not supposed to have affiliation to any political party. Dinakar Desai had liking for socialist ideology, and he contributed to the socialist movement in Uttara Kannada District. Praja Socialist Party did make inroads in Assembly Constituencies of the district in the General Election, 1962, and, made further gains by winning few seats later in Assembly Constituencies of the district in the General Election, 1967.

He contested again for the Parliament of India (Lok Sabha) in the General Elections, 1967 (Kanara Lok Sabha Constituency) as an Independent candidate with the support of combined opposition political parties, and, won the election. As member of the Lok Sabha, he served as Member of the Parliamentary Committee on Education constituted in 1968.

With the dissolution of Lok Sabha, mid term poll was declared in 1971; Dinakar Desai contested again but was defeated.

Dinakar Desai had immense love for Kannada language and the people. He played active role in States Re-organisation Committee (ಕರ್ನಾಟಕ ಏಕೀಕರಣ ಸಮಿತಿ). With the concerted effort of the Committee, it was possible to have a new state of Karnataka, bringing all Kannada language speaking people together.

6 Poet, Writer and Journalist: :

Poet:

Dinakar Desai was famous as Poet. He commenced writing poems at an early age - in 1926 (approximately) by contributing to the small newspapers in the district.

While pursuing higher education he came under the influence of eminent professors and literary personalities like V Seetharamaiah (ವೀಸಿ), T N Shrikantaiah (ತೀನಂಶ್ರೀ), T S Venkannaiah in Bengaluru; and, B M Srikantaiah (ಬಿಎಂಶ್ರೀ) in Mysuru. This was the impetus to his poetry writing.

With the encouragement of B M Srikantaiah (ಬಿಎಂಶ್ರೀ), ತಳಿರು (Taliru) - an anthology of poems by the young talents of the college was published in 1930. Dinakar Desai had his contribution.

Dinakar Desai also started writing poems in his mother tongue Konkani in 1930.

He tried and wrote poems in various formats, but settled to “chutuka” - four-line limerick. It is learned that he commenced writing “chutaka” sometime around the year 1955, and it became his signature format. His poems covered various genres and themes.

Writer:

Dinakar Desai, as writer had few publications. He wrote on some problems related to farmers, labourers, education, famine etc. and a travelogue. These works were not of much literary value, but proved useful and made good reading.

Journalist:

Dinakar Desai tried his hand as journalist also though it was not his cup of tea. He had no commercial interests either. He thought of educating the rural masses in the district highlighting the socio-economic problems confronting around them. Under his stewardship, Kanara WelfareTrust (KWT) commenced publication of Kannada weekly paper ಜನಸೇವಕ. The first issue was published on 26 January 1955. The paper was received well by the public. Ammembal Anand was the editor; leading literary figures in the District like Gourish Kaikini were contributing regularly. Dinakar Desai was playing active and leading role in writing critical assessment of the current affairs. The paper had also literary value. Most attractive and important item was a short poem of four lines (ಚುಟಕ) written by Dinakar Desai under the caption ಭತ್ತದ ತೆನೆ (bhattada tene). As mentioned earlier, the paper had no commercial interests and the Trust had run huge loss. The management of the paper thus took painful decision of discontinuing the paper, with the publication of the last issue on 2 August 1972. The paper was in circulation for more than seventeen years (18th year - 31 edition- 915 issues).

== Personal achievements ==
1. Awards and honours:

Awards:

- Bombay State Award in 1956 for poetical works ಮಕ್ಕಳ ಗೀತ; ಕವನ ಸಂಗ್ರಹ
- Karnataka Sahitya Academi Award in 1972 in recognition of his contribution in literary field.
- “Varakavi” (ವರಕವಿ) felicitation in 1973 by Bombay Kannadigas.
- Karnatak University, Dharwad conferred Honorary Doctorate (D. Litt) in 1975 in recognition of his educational and social service.
- Government of Karnata awarded plaque with State map in recognition of service rendered in State unification.
- B N Gupta Janmabhumi Award for journalism in 1976
- Karnataka Sahitya Academi Award in 1980 for ದಿನಕರನ ಚೌಪದಿ (consolidated publication of his short poems - ಚುಟಕ)

Tours abroad:

Dinakar Desai toured Denmark to attend the convention of the International Labour Organization held at Copenhagen, Denmark in November 1945. At this period he also toured in England and had study on labour, education etc. there. He narrated his experiences on these tours in a travelogue ನಾ ಕಂಡ ಪಡುವಣ.

Dinakar Desai toured USA as one of the members of the Indian delegation to convention of the International Labour Organization held at Seattle, USA in 1946.

Dinakar Desai toured England in 1959 at the invitation of the British Council and paid visit to the educational institutions there.

2. Publications: *

- particulars of the publishers indicated in brackets

I. Poems:

1. ರೈತರ ಹಾಡುಗಳು (1949) (ಉತ್ತರ ಕನ್ನಡ ಜಿಲ್ಲಾ ರೈತಕೂಟ)

2. ಕವನ ಸಂಗ್ರಹ (1950) (ಶೇ. ಗೋ. ಕುಲಕರ್ಣಿ, ಸಾಧನ ಮುದ್ರಣಾಲಯ, ಧಾರವಾಡ)

3. ಮಕ್ಕಳ ಗೀತಗಳು (1951) (ಶೇ. ಗೋ. ಕುಲಕರ್ಣಿ, ಸಾಧನ ಮುದ್ರಣಾಲಯ, ಧಾರವಾಡ)

4. ಮಕ್ಕಳ ಪದ್ಯಗಳು (1956) (ಜನತಾ ಪ್ರಕಾಶನ, ಕೆನರಾ ವೆಲ್ ಫೆರ್ ಟ್ರಸ್ಟ್, ಅಂಕೋಲಾ)

5. ಹೂಗೊಂಚಲು (1958) (ಜನತಾ ಪ್ರಕಾಶನ, ಕೆನರಾ ವೆಲ್ ಫೆರ್ ಟ್ರಸ್ಟ್, ಅಂಕೋಲಾ)

6. ಮಕ್ಕಳ ಪದ್ಯ (1976) (ಜನತಾ ಪ್ರಕಾಶನ, ಕೆನರಾ ವೆಲ್ ಫೆರ್ ಟ್ರಸ್ಟ್, ಅಂಕೋಲಾ)

7. ದಿನಕರನ ಚೌಪದಿ (1978) (ಕೆನರಾ ವೆಲ್ ಫೆರ್ ಟ್ರಸ್ಟ್, ಅಂಕೋಲಾ)

8. ದಿನಕರಾಲಿ ಕವನಾಂ (ಕೊಂಕಣಿ) (1981) (ಸರ್ವಂಟ್ಸ್ ಆಫ್ ಇಂಡಿಯಾ ಸೊಸೈಟಿ, ಮುಂಬಯಿ)

9. ದಾಸಾಳ (1983) (ಕೆನರಾ ವೆಲ್ ಫೆರ್ ಟ್ರಸ್ಟ್, ಅಂಕೋಲಾ)

II. Books:

1. ಪ್ರಪಂಚದ ಕೆಲಸಗಾರ (1936) (ಸರ್ವಂಟ್ಸ್ ಆಫ್ ಇಂಡಿಯಾ ಸೊಸೈಟಿ, ಮುಂಬಯಿ)

2. Primary Education in India (1938) (Servants of India Society, Mumbai)

3. Maritime Labour in India (1940) (Servants of India Society, Mumbai)

4. The Mahamandaleshwaras under the Chalukyas of Kalyani (1951) (Indian Historical Research Institute, Mumbai)

5. ನಾ ಕಂಡ ಪಡುವಣ (1961) (ಮನೋಹರ ಗ್ರಂಥಮಾಲೆ, ಧಾರವಾಡ)

III. Reports:

1. Report towards Literate Bombay (1939) (Servants of India Society, Mumbai)

2. Land Rents in North Kanara (1940) (Servants of India Society, Mumbai)

3. Report of the Bijapur Famine Relief Committee - 1943 (1944) (Servants of India Society, Mumbai)

4. Report on Police Firing at Amalnar (1946) (Servants of India Society, Mumbai)

5. Among Indian Seamen in Great Britain (1946) (Servants of India Society, Mumbai)
