= Yashwant Vithoba Chittal =

Indian writer (1928–2014)

Yashawant Vithoba Chittal
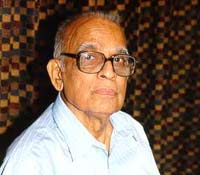
- Born: 3 August 1928; Hanehalli, Uttar Kannada, Karnataka
- Died: 22 March 2014 (aged 85); Mumbai
- Occupations: Chemist, fiction writer
- Writing career
- Language: Kannada
- Period: 1950-2014
- Genre: Fiction
- Notable awards: Sahitya Akademi Award, Dr.Masti Award, Adikavi Pampa Award
- Movement: Navya

Yashwant Vithoba Chittal (3 August 1928 – 22 March 2014) was a Kannada fiction writer. G. S. Amur said: "His short stories, many of them were outstanding, and came with his distinct touch.The kind of experimentation he did with language, style and narrative is unparalleled."

== Biography ==
He was born in Hanehalli, Uttar Kannada District. He completed his primary school education from his village school and his high school from the Gibbs High School, Kumta (1944).Later he did his Bachelors in science and Bachelors in technology both from Bombay University being a top ranker and gold medalist in the year 1955 and master's degree in chemical engineering from Stevens Institute of Technology, United States, and simultaneously pursued a career in science and technology along with literature. His contributions in the field of Polymer Science and synthetic resins was well recognized and he was selected as Fellow of Plastics and Rubber Institute, London.

== Collection of Stories ==
- Sandarshana/ಸಂದರ್ಶನ (1957)
- Aabolina/ಆಬೇೂಲಿನ (1960)
- Aata/ಆಟ (1969)
- Aayda Kathegalu/ಆಯ್ದ ಕತೆಗಳು (1976)
- Katheyadalu Hudugi/ಕತೆಯಾದಳು ಹುಡುಗಿ (1980)
- Benya/ಬೇನ್ಯಾ (1983)
- Samagra Kathegalu/ಸಮಗ್ರ ಕತೆಗಳು (1983)
- Siddhartha/ಸಿದ್ಧಾರ್ಥ (1988)
- Aivattondu Kathegalu/ಐವತ್ತೊಂದು ಕತೆಗಳು (2001)
- Kumatege Banda Kindarijogi/ಕುಮಟೆಗೆ ಬಂದಾ ಕಿಂದರಿಜೇೂಗಿ
- Odihoda Mutti Banda/ಓಡಿಹೇೂದಾ ಮುಟ್ಟಿ ಬಂದಾ
- Puttana Hejje Kaanodilla/ಪುಟ್ಟನ ಹೆಜ್ಜೆ ಕಾಣೇೂದಿಲ್ಲ
- Aayda Kathegalu/ಆಯ್ದ ಕತೆಗಳು
- Koli Kooguva Munna/ಕೇೂಳಿ ಕೂಗುವ ಮುನ್ನ
- Samagra Kathegalu Volume 1 and 2/ಸಮಗ್ರ ಕತೆಗಳು ಸಂಪುಟ ೧ ಮತ್ತು ೨

== Novels ==
- Muru Daarigalu/ಮೂರು ದಾರಿಗಳು (1964) [Made into Kannada Movie by Girish Kasaravally]
- Shikaari/ಶಿಕಾರಿ (1979)
- Cheda/ಛೇದ (1985)
- Purushottama/ಪುರುಷೇೂತ್ತಮ (1990) [Also Translated into English by Penguin Books]
- Kendra Vrittanta/ಕೇಂದ್ರ ವೃತ್ತಾಂತ (1996)
- Digambara/ದಿಗಂಬರ (Unpublished)

== Poetry ==
- Danapeyaacheya Oni/ದಣಪೆಯಾಚೆಯ ಓಣಿ

== Criticism ==
- Sahityada Sapta Dhatugalu/ಸಾಹಿತ್ಯದ ಸಪ್ತ ಧಾತುಗಳು
- Sahitya, Srujanasheelathe Mattu Naanu/ಸಾಹಿತ್ಯ, ಸೃಜನಶೀಲತೆ ಮತ್ತು ನಾನು
- Anthakarana/ಅಂತಃಕರಣ

== Translations ==
- The Hunt/Shikaari - English Translation by Pratibha Umashankar-Nadiger (2019)
- Purushottama (1990)
- The Boy who Talked to Trees/ - English Translation by Ramachandra Sharma & Padma Ramachandra(1994) Collection of short stories.

The US Library of Congress holds 15 of his titles, including works translated into English and other languages.

== Movies and Teleserial ==
- Mooru Daarigalu/ಮೂರು ದಾರಿಗಳು Directed by Girish Kasaravalli
- Mukhamukhi/ಮುಖಾಮುಖಿ (DD Chandana)
