= Devarbhavi =

- village
- Location in Karnataka, India Devarbhavi (India)
- Coordinates: 14.5540500°N 74.3547670°E
- Country: India
- State: Karnataka
- District: Uttara Kannada

Languages
  - Official: Kannada
- Time zone: UTC+5:30 (IST)

Devarbhavi is a village in Kumta Taluka. It is next to Torke village.

== Temples ==
- Kengal Parameshwari Temple, Devarbhavi
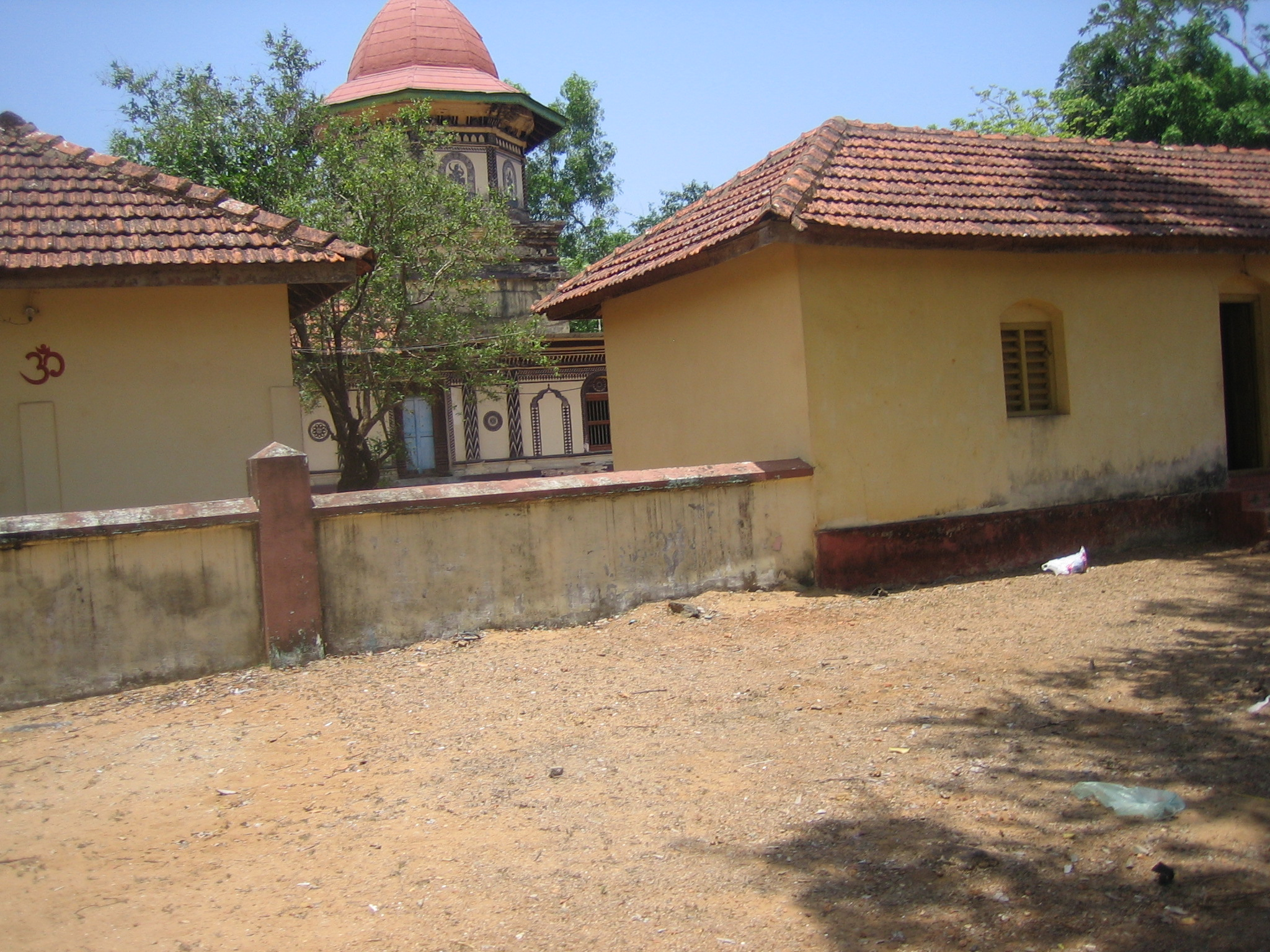
Kengal Parameshwari temple, Devarbhavi
