= Gourish Kaikini =

Indian author and teacher (1912–2002)

- Born: 12 September 1912; Gokarna
- Died: 14 November 2002 (aged 90); Gokarna
- Education: Karnataka College, Dharawad
- Occupations: Litterateur, Teacher, Philosopher
- Spouse: Shanthabai (m. 1953)
- Writing career
- Pen name: Vaishwanara; Gourishankara; Aduge bhatta; GVK
- Language: Kannada; Konkani; Marathi; English
- Notable awards: Sahitya Academy award, Rajyotsava Award

Gourish Kaikini (12 September 1912 – 14 November 2002) was a teacher and Kannada litterateur. He received many awards including the Sahitya Academy award and the Rajyotsava Award given by the government of Karnataka. He also wrote in Marathi and Konkani.

== Early life ==
Gourish Kaikini was born on 12 September 1912. He graduated from Dharwad, and served as a high-school teacher at Anandashram High School, Bankikodla and Bhadrakali High School, Gokarna from 1937 to 1976. He married Shantabai in 1953. His son Jayant Kaikini is a poet and writer in the Kannada literature.

== Works ==
Gourish Kaikini wrote a total of 62 books, most of them in Kannada and Marathi. He has written novels as well as poetry collections. He served as a writer and a columnist for several newspapers and periodicals. His style of writing attracted widespread acclaim. Dialectic between tradition and modernity has been Kaikin's central concern.

Kaikini, who initially wrote in Marathi, started writing in Kannada in the latter part of the 1930s. His popular works include Navamanavathavaada, Nasthika Mathu Devaru, Manovignanada Roopureshegalu, and Sathyarthi.

== Awards and honors ==
Kaikini has been honored with number of awards. He was honored with the Ideal Teacher award in 1973. He was bestowed with the diamond jubilee award of the Kannada Sahitya Parishat, Vardhamana Prashasti, Sahitya Academy Award, Karnatak University's honorary doctorate degree, Karnataka Rajyotstava Prashasti, Dr Sham Bha Forum Prashanti, Mangalore Sandesh Prashanti and Konkani Sahitya Prashasti for his Konkani work Meenakshi. An organization has been set up in his name and writers in Kannada literature are conferred with awards every year from the organization.

== Major works ==
Kaikini's major works include Navamanavathavaada, Nasthika Mathu Devaru, Manovignanada Roopureshegalu and Sathyarthi.
