= B. C. Ramchandra Sharma =

Indian novelist

- Born: 28 November 1925; Nagamangala, Kingdom of Mysore, British India
- Died: 18 April 2005 (aged 79); Bangalore, India
- Education: Mysore University
- Occupations: Playwright, translator, writer
- Years active: 1952–2005
- Spouse: Padma
- Children: 3

Bogadi Chandrashekhar Sharma Ramchandra Sharma (28 November 1925 – 18 April 2005) was an Indian playwright, translator and writer in Kannada language.

Sharma was one of the foremost poets of modern Kannada poetry and is best known for his “Saptapadi”, a collection of poems which won him the Sahitya Akademi Award in 1998.

His first anthology of poetry was “Hridaya Geethe” (1952). He did his BSc and BEd from Mysore University and for sometime he was a teacher in a school. As a psychologist and educationist his thesis on the IQ of Indian children got him a PhD. He lived in England, Ethiopia and Zambia and returned to India in 1982.’His works include Yelusuthina Kote (1953), Bhuvi needida spoorthi (1956), Hesaragathe (1969), Brahamana Huduga (1978), Mathu Matha (1984), Dehalige banda hosa varsha (1988) and Saptapadi (1996). Sharma was regarded as one among those who added a new dimension to the Kannada short story and has to his credit four anthologies of short stories - Mandara Kusuma; Yelaneya jeeva; Belagaithu and Kathegarana kathe.In the 1960s he wrote plays some of which include Balasanje, Nilakagada, Seragina Kenda, Vaitharini and Neralu.As a translator he introduced into Kannada, some of the best poems from other languages. In his collection “Ee Shatamanada nuru English kavanagalu” (100 English poems of the 20th century) he has translated 100 poems by 39 English poets. He has also translated, with the help of his wife Padma, the stories of Masthi and Chithala and novels of Kuvempu and Masthi into English. Kuvempu’s Kannada novel, “Kanooru Heggadathi” has been translated in English as “House of Kanooru.”He received several awards including Central Sahitya Akademi award (1998), Karnataka Sahitya Academy award (1985), Karnataka Rajyotsava award (1997) and Shivaram Karanth award (1996).

== Works ==
- Yelusuthina Kote (1953)
- Bhuvi Needida Spoorthi (1956)
- Hesaragathe (1969)
- Brahamana Huduga (1978)
- Mathu Matha (1984)
- Dehalige Banda Hosa Varsha (1988)
- Saptapadi (1996)
- Home and away – A collection of Kannada short stories.

== Awards ==
- Karnataka Sahitya Academy Award (1985)
- Sahitya Akademi Award (1998)
- Shivaram Karanth Award (1996)
- Rajyotsava Award (1997)
