= Bankikodla-Hanehalli =

- village
- Location in Karnataka, India Bankikodla-Hanehalli (India)
- Coordinates: 14.55°N 74.31667°E
- Country: India
- State: Karnataka
- District: Uttara Kannada
- Elevation: 586 m (1,923 ft)

Languages
  - Official: Kannada
- Time zone: UTC+5:30 (IST)
- PIN: 581319
- Telephone code: 8386 257147

Bankikodla and Hanehalli are the twin neighbouring villages in a valley in Uttara Kannada district in the Indian state of Karnataka.

Just to the north of the village, the Gangavalli River joins the Arabian Sea. The town of Gokarna is just to the south of the village. The surrounding Sahyadri Mountains hug the Arabian sea with open fields providing recreational opportunities for the locals. It has creeks and shallow ponds and bridges, which are vulnerable in the rainy seasons. For religious purposes, there are temples, a church, and a mosque.

During British rule in India, the Chitrapur Saraswat Brahmins built Anandashram High School (1884) for their children, but a majority of them eventually moved out to Mumbai. The younger population is now moving out of the village and the older generations, especially the retired communities, have started coming back to the village.

== Location ==
The village is 455 kilometres (283 mi) from Bangalore, 242 kilometres (150 mi) north of Mangalore and 61 kilometres (38 mi) from Karwar. Bankikodla-Hanehalli lies between the Gangavali River and River Aghanashini and is situated along the Karwar coast of the Arabian Sea. It is near to the college towns of Kumta, Ankola, Surathkal and Manipal.

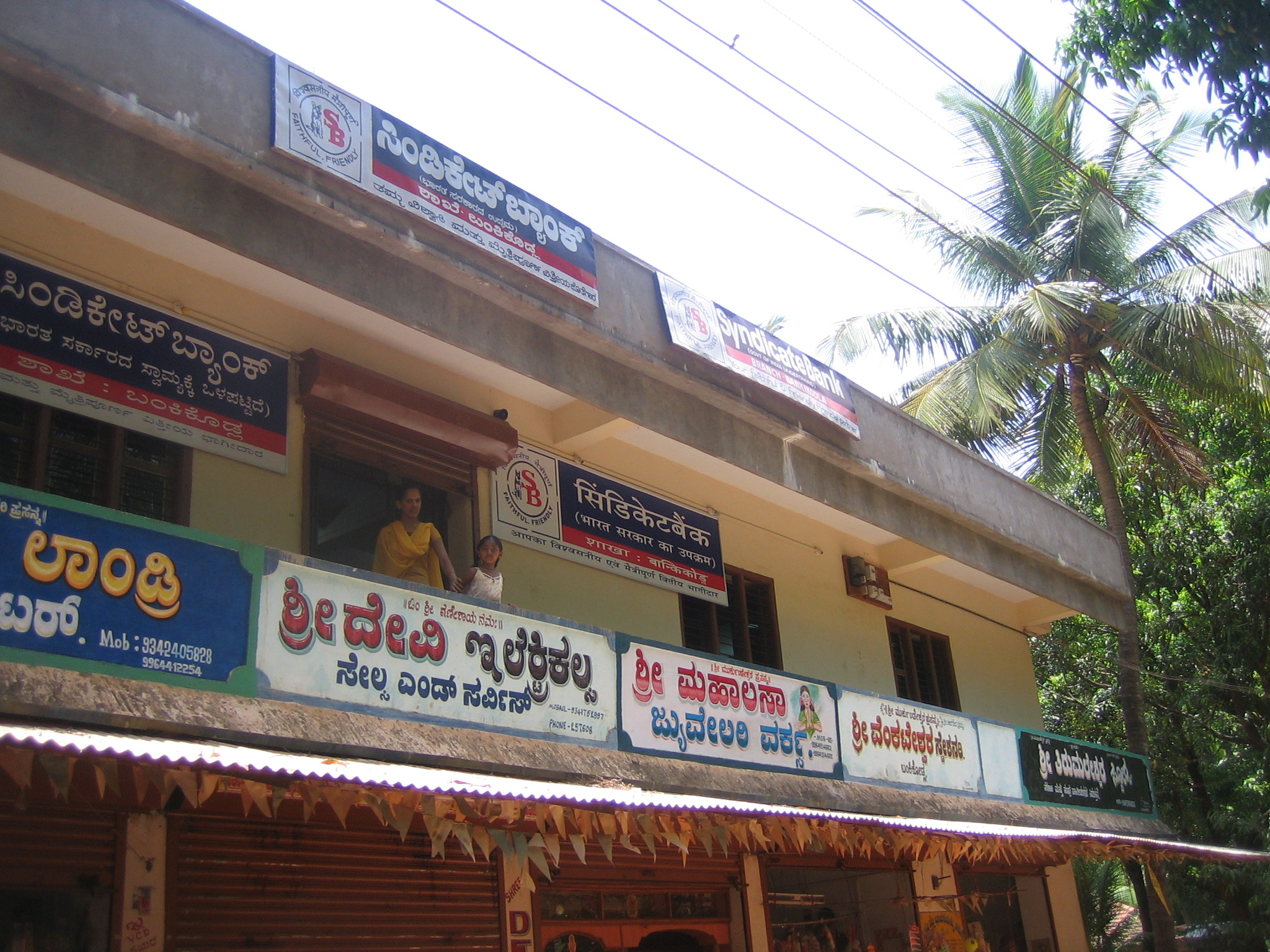
Bankikodla Bazar

Bankikodla-Hanehalli can be reached by buses and taxicabs from Kumta (36 kilometres (22 mi)), Ankola (25 kilometres (16 mi)) and Karwar (61 kilometres (38 mi)) on national highway 17( NH-17). Karnataka state road transport corporation runs buses from many places. Goa Airport, Hubli Airport and Mangalore International Airport are the closest airports. It can be reached by the Konkan Railway on the Mumbai to Mangalore route. The Madangeri railway station is 8 kilometres (5.0 mi) from the village while Bavikodla beach is 1 mile (1.6 km) away. Kashi Vishwanatha Temple community center is at Nelaguni on the way to Gokarna.

== Climate ==
- Summer : Marc– mid June,
- Rainy : mid June–October
- Winter : November–February.

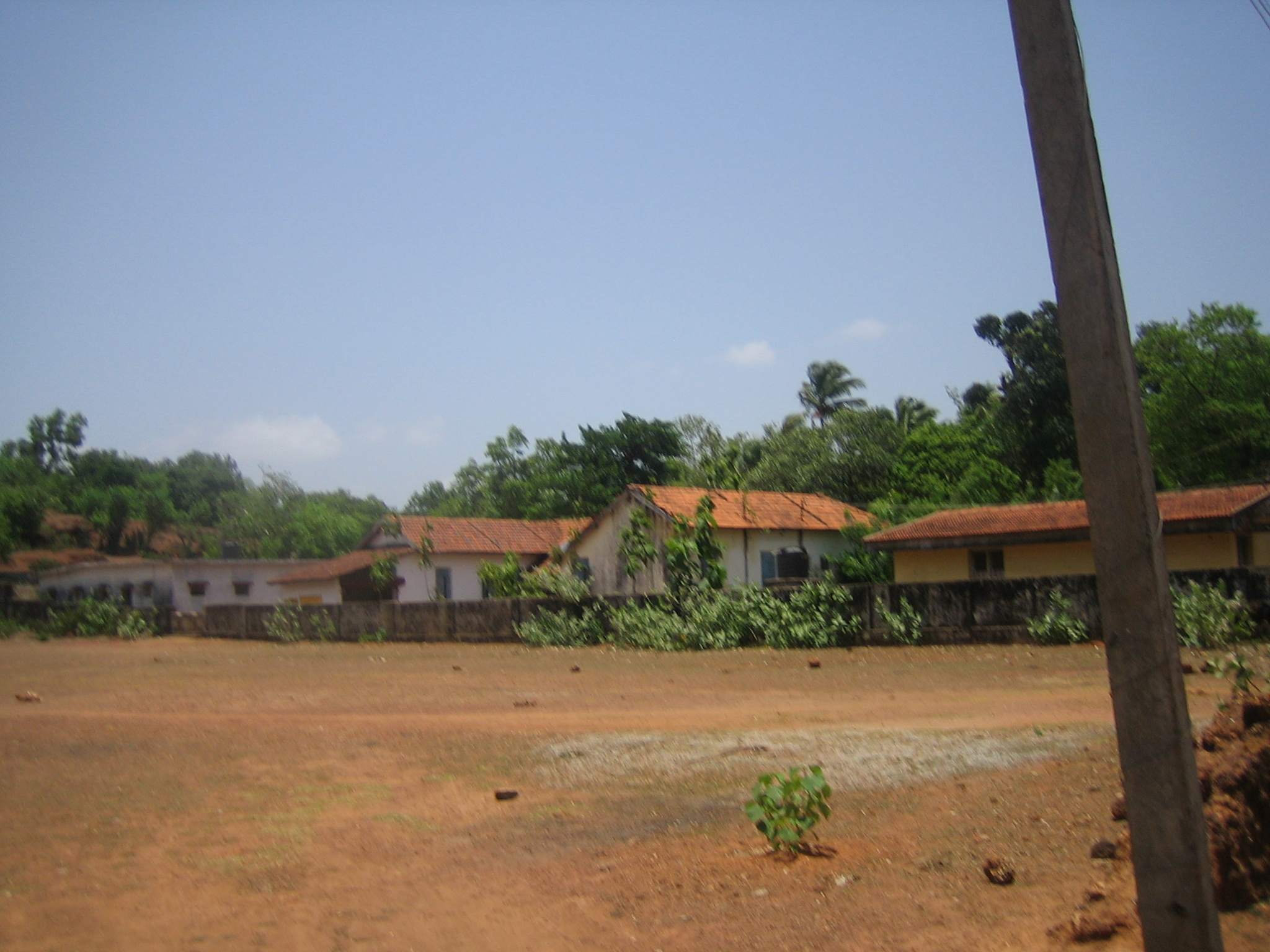
Health center

Since the town is located on the coast, it has a moderate climate, with temperatures in the range of 28^{c} to 36^{c} during summer and 26^{c} to 20^{c} during winter. The rainy season has heavy rains by the south-west monsoon. The average annual rainfall is about 3000 mm.

== Population ==
Population (from per Indian villages site)	Female	Male
2,483	1,278	1205

== Industries ==
- Handloom factory

== Education ==
- Anandashram High School, Bankikodla - established 1884

== Temples ==
- Ammavara Devasthan
- Mukundi Devasthan
- Bankanatheshwara Devasthan
- Lakshmi Narayana Devasthan
- Dugrambika Devasthan
- Kashi Vishwanath Matt
- Mahasati Devasathan

== Notable personalities ==
- Gangadhar Chittal
- Yashwant Chittal
- Gopal Gaonkar
- Arvind Nadkarni
- Dayanand Nadkarni
- Mangesh Nadkarni
- Ramesh L. Nadkarni
- Sundar Nadkarni
