= Vinayaka Krishna Gokak =

Indian writer (1909–1992)

V.K Gokak
- Born: 10 August 1909; Savanur State, Princely state, Deccan States Agency, British India (Savanur in present-day Haveri district of Karnataka)
- Died: 28 April 1992 (aged 82); Bengaluru, Karnataka, India
- Occupations: Professor, writer
- Spouse: Sharada Betadur
- Children: 4
- Writing career
- Genre: Fiction
- Movement: Navodaya

Signature
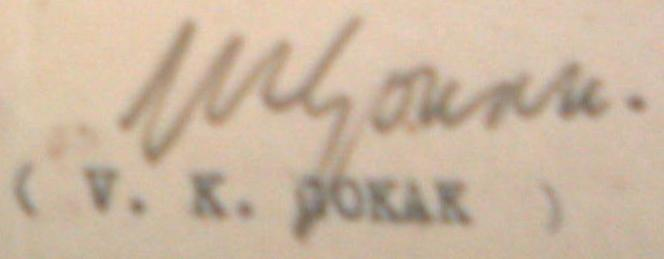

Vinayaka Krishna Gokak (9 August 1909 – 28 April 1992), abbreviated in Kannada as Vi. Kru. Gokak, was an Indian writer in the Kannada language and a scholar of English and Kannada literatures. He was the fifth writer to be honoured with the Jnanpith Award in 1990 for Kannada language, for his epic Bharatha Sindhu Rashmi which deals with the Vedic age. In 1961, Gokak was awarded the Padma Shri from the Government of India.

Bust of V.K Gokak at Dr. Rajkumar Children Park (Jinke Park), Bengaluru (2026)

== Academic life ==
Gokak was born in a Deshastha Brahmin family on 9 August 1909 to Sundarabai and Krishna Rao. He was educated in Majid High School, Savanur, and attended the Karnataka College Dharawada where he studied literature. He was later awarded first class honours by the University of Oxford. On his return from Oxford in 1938, he became the principal of Willingdon College, Sangli. He was principal of Rajaram College, Kolhapur, Maharashtra, from 1950 to 1952. Between 1983 and 1987, he served as the president of the Sahitya Akademi. He also served as the director of Indian Institute of Advanced Study, Shimla, and the Central Institute of English, Hyderabad. He was an ardent devotee of the spiritual guru Sathya Sai Baba and served as the first vice-chancellor of Sri Sathya Sai Institute of Higher Learning, Puttaparthi, between 1981 and 1985, after a stint with the Bangalore University. His novel Samarasave Jeevana is considered one of the typical works of Navodaya literature in Kannada.

== Literary career and success ==
Gokak was a prolific writer in both Kannada and English. He was deeply influenced by the Kannada poet D.R Bendre who mentored him during his early forays into Kannada literature. Bendre is reputed to have said that were Gokak to allow his talent to bloom in Kannada, there was a bright future in wait for Gokak and Kannada literature. His Kavyanama (Pen name) was "VINAYAKA"

His epic Bharatha Sindhurashmi is 35000 lines long.

His novel 'Samarasave Jeevana' was translated by his daughter Yashodhara Bhat into English under the title 'The Agony and the Ecstasy' and released to worldwide popularity.

In the 1980s, Karnataka was in the midst of an agitation which demanded the replacement of Sanskrit with Kannada as the medium of instruction in schools. V.K Gokak also headed the 'Gokak Committee' which recommended declaring Kannada as the first language in schools in the state.

Gokak's writing reflected his interest in religion, philosophy, education and cultures. His education abroad prompted him to write two sets of travelogues.

The Navodaya movement was at its peak and Gokak stayed true to his spirit- his poems showed nuances of Victorian poetry, oral traditions in Kannada storytelling and epics in Sanskrit and Kannada.

V.K Gokak wrote many collections of poetry under the pen name Vinayaka. These collections include 'Samudra Geethegalu', 'Baaladeguladalli', 'Abhyudaya', 'Dhyava Prithvi' and 'Urnabha'.

Gokak's anthology of poetry by Indian poets titled The Golden Treasury of Indo Anglican poetry was a treatise on poets like Sri Aurobindo, Sarojini Naidu and Toru Dutta, Nissim Ezekiel and Kamala Das.

In the late 1960s he was deeply influenced by Sri Sathya Sai Baba of Puttaparthi and over the years, Gokak became the medium for translating the guru's words into English and spreading it to the world. His book 'The Advent of Sathya Sai' explains the meaning of Sathya Sai Baba's miracles, his work with the poor and his impact on the educational system.

The state of Karnataka hosts a series of literary events to mark Gokak's birth centenary on 9 August of every year.

== Writings ==
=== Epics ===
- Bharatha Sindhu Rashmi.

=== Novels ===
- Samarasave Jeevana – Ijjodu Mattu Erilita (vol 1)
- Samarasave Jeevana – Samudrayana Mattu Nirvahana (vol 2)
- Samarasave Jeevana – Narahari Nootana Yugada Pravaadi (vol 3) - Gokak originally authored this in english with title 'Narahari the prophet of New India" which was translated to kannada by S A Ramakrishna.

=== Poetry collections ===
- Urnanabha
- Abyudaya
- Baaladeguladalli
- Dyava Pruthvi (Kendra Saahithya Academy Award)
- Samudra Geethegalu
- English words

=== Other ===
- Sahitya Vimarsheya Kelavu Tatvagalu
- Nanna Jeevana Drishti
- Jeevana Paatagalu
- Kala Siddhantha
- India & World Culture
- Gokak Kruthi Chintana
- Pravasa katanagalu

== Honors and awards ==
- Presidentship of the 40th Kannada Sahitya Sammelana in 1958
- Honorary doctorates from the Karnatak University
- Honorary doctorates from the Pacific University of the USA
- Central Sahitya Akademi award for his 'Dyava Prithivi' in 1961
- Jnanpith award-for his Bharatha sindhu rashmi, in 1990

=== Translations ===
- Voices of the Himalaya: translated by the authors, Kamala Ratnam, V.K. Gokak and others. (Bombay: Asia Publishing House, 1966. vi, 70 p. Poems by celebrated poet Ramdhari Singh 'Dinkar'

== See also ==
- Gokak agitation – a language campaign
