= Ankola =

- Town
- Location in Karnataka, India
- Coordinates: 14.667°N 74.3°E
- Country: India
- State: Karnataka
- District: Uttara Kannada
- Zonal Council: Southern
- Nearest Large City: Karwar

Government
  - Body: Town Municipal Council

Area
  - Town: 14 km^{2} (5.4 sq mi)
  - Rural: 905 km^{2} (349 sq mi)
- Elevation: 16 m (52 ft)

Population (2011)
  - Town: 22,249
  - Density: 1,600/km^{2} (4,100/sq mi)
  - Rural: 92,023

Languages
  - Official: Kannada
  - Local: Kannada, Konkani
- Time zone: UTC+5:30 (IST)
- PIN: 581 314
- Telephone code: +91-8388
- Vehicle registration: KA-30
- Literacy: 90.63%
- Sex ratio: 1013 ♂/♀
- Website: http://www.ankolatown.mrc.gov.in

Ankola is a town municipal council and taluka in the Uttara Kannada district of the Indian state of Karnataka. The town is approximately 33 km (21 mi) from district headquarters Karwar.

Ankola is a small town surrounded by temples, schools, paddy fields, and mango orchards. Its name derives from the common name for Alangium salviifolium, a flower that grows in nearby hills. It is located on the coast of the Laccadive Sea and has many natural beaches. Ankola is known for a native breed of mango, Kari Ishad, as well as its cashews.

== Geography ==
Ankola is located at 14°39′38″N 74°18′17″E, and has an average elevation of 17 metres (56 ft). The prominent Gangavalli River, also known as the Bedti River, flows near the town. Summer temperatures range between 30 and 35 °C (86 and 95 °F) with slightly lower winter temperatures between 20 and 33 °C (68 and 91 °F).

The nearby village of Belekeri, a natural port, is primarily used to ship iron ore to China and Europe.

== Demographics ==
Religion in Ankola town
	Percent
Hinduism	88.50%
Islam	9.83%
Christianity	1.55%
Jainism	0.04%
Others	0.08%

Religion in Ankola taluka
	Percent
Hinduism	95.30%
Islam	4.00%
Christianity	0.64%
Jainism	0.01%
Others	0.06%

As of 2011 Indian census, the total population of Ankola Taluk is 101,549 living in 21,079 houses, spread across a total of 309 villages and 20 panchayats. There are 51,398 males and 50,151 females. The outskirts of Ankola, which is considered a "Town Panchayat" (nagar panchayat), has a population of 22,249 of which 11,034 are males while 11,215 are females as per the report released by the Census of India 2011.

The population of Children under the age of 6 is 2025 which is 9.10% of the total population of Ankola (TP + OG). In Ankola Town Panchayat, the female sex ratio is 1016 against the state average of 973. Moreover, the child sex ratio in Ankola is around 1013 compared to Karnataka state average of 948. The literacy rate of Ankola city is 90.63%, higher than the state average of 75.36%. In Ankola, male literacy is around 94.63% while the female literacy rate is 86.69%.

Ankola Town Panchayat has a total administration of over 5,271 houses.

The main language spoken is Kannada with Konkani having a sizeable population in the taluk. Among the Muslims, Urdu is common.

== Villages of Ankola ==
Villages of Ankola include:

- Achave
- Adigon
- Adlur
- Agragon (Agragone)
- Agsur
- Algeri (Alageri)
- Andle
- Aversa
- Balale Bandar
- Baleguli Bela
- Basgod
- Belambar
- Belekeri
- Belse
- Bhavikeri (Bavikeri)
- Bidrager
- Bilehoingi
- Bobruwada
- Bogribail
- Bole
- Brahmur
- Devigadde
- Dongri
- Devarbhavi
- Gundabala
- Halvalli
- Harwada (Harvada)
- Hattikeri
- Honnekeri
- Padmapur Heggar
- Makkigadde
- Honnebail
- Heggarnikotebavi
- Hichkad
- Hillur
- Hittalamakki
- Hoskeri
- Joog
- Jamgod
- Kabgal
- Kakaramath
- Kalbhag
- Kanasigadde
- Kalleshwar
- Kammani
- Kanagil (Kangil)
- Kanthri
- Keni
- Kendige
- Kenkanishivapur
- Kogre
- Kodlagadde
- Kumbarakeri
- Kuntgani
- Lakkeguli
- Laxmeshwar
- Manigadde
- Manjaguni
- Matakeri
- Mogta
- Moralli
- Nadibag
- Navagadde
- Nellurkanchinbail
- Poojgeri
- Sagadgeri
- Shetageri
- Sheveguli
- Shikliturli
- Shinganmakki
- Shirgunji
- Shirur
- Sunksal
- Surve (Soorve)
- Talebail
- Takatgeri
- Torke
- Tenkankeri
- Ulware
- Vaidya Heggar
- Vandige
- Varilbena
- Vasar Kudrige
- Wadibogri
- Konki
- Kaigadi
- Shavakar
- Pallikeri
- Amber hithla

== Salt Satyagraha ==
In 1930, after the success of Mahatma Gandhi's Salt Satyagraha, Karnataka decided to conduct its own. On 13 April, in the presence of about 40,000 people M.P. Nadakarni broke the salt law in Ankola. The people of Ankola collectively plunged into the heroic prowess of India's freedom struggle. Revu Honnappa Nayak, Honnappa Mangeshkar bought the first packet of salt auctioned for 30 rupees. After the auction Swami Vidyananda addressed the gathering in which leaders like Karnad Sadashiva Rao.

Karabandi Dictator॥ Basagoda Rama Nayak, Smt Umabai Kundapur, Dr Hardikar, T.S Naikand others participated. The police promptly arrested the leaders, but the Sathyagraha continued for 45 days. Salt Sathyagraha was offered in nearly 30 centres like Mangalore, Kundapur, Udupi, Puttur, Padubidre, etc. in Karnataka. Students came out in large numbers to prepare salt and sell it from house to house. When Gandhiji decided to raid the salt depot at Dharsana, a similar raid was undertaken in Karnataka at Sanikatte. A group of volunteers led by Sridhar Panduranga Balaji collected a few maunds of salt and carried it to Kumta, where the whole stock was sold in 15 minutes.

Four taluks in Karnataka namely Hirekerur in Dharwad district and Ankola, Sirsi and Siddapura in North Kanara district were selected for organizing the no-tax campaign. Despite repressive measures by the authorities, the campaign was a huge success. More than 1500 activists were arrested in Karnataka for participating in the Civil-Disobedience Movement from 1930 to 1931. These historic events led to Ankola being named the "Bardoli of Karnataka".

== Beaches ==
Ankola lies on the coast of the Arabian Sea and has many beaches, such as: Belekeri Beach, Nadibag Beach, Belambar Beach, Shedikulli Beach, Gabitkeni Beach, Honne gudi Beach (five km (3.1 mi) from Ankola), Honey Beach, and Keni Beach.

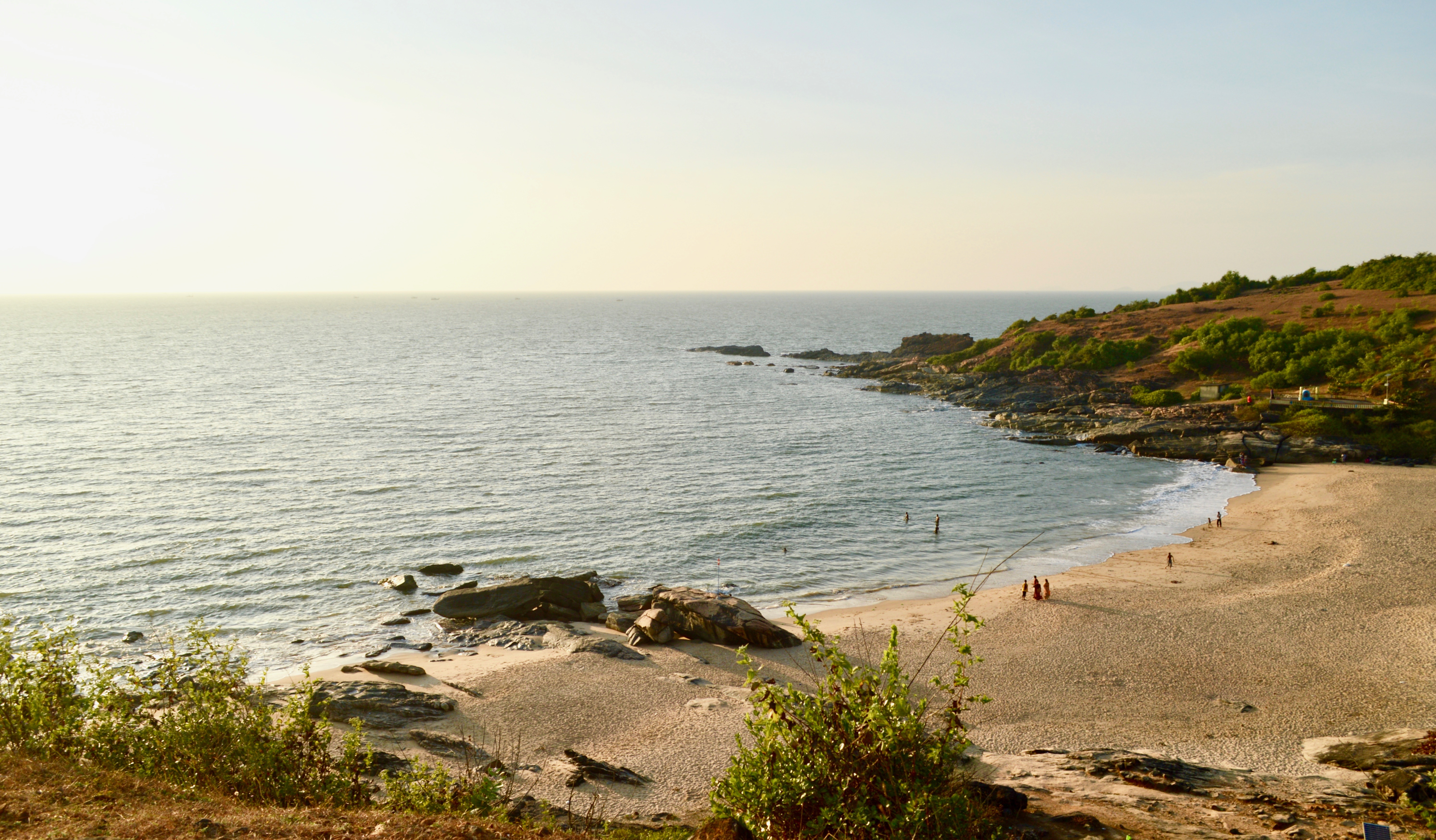

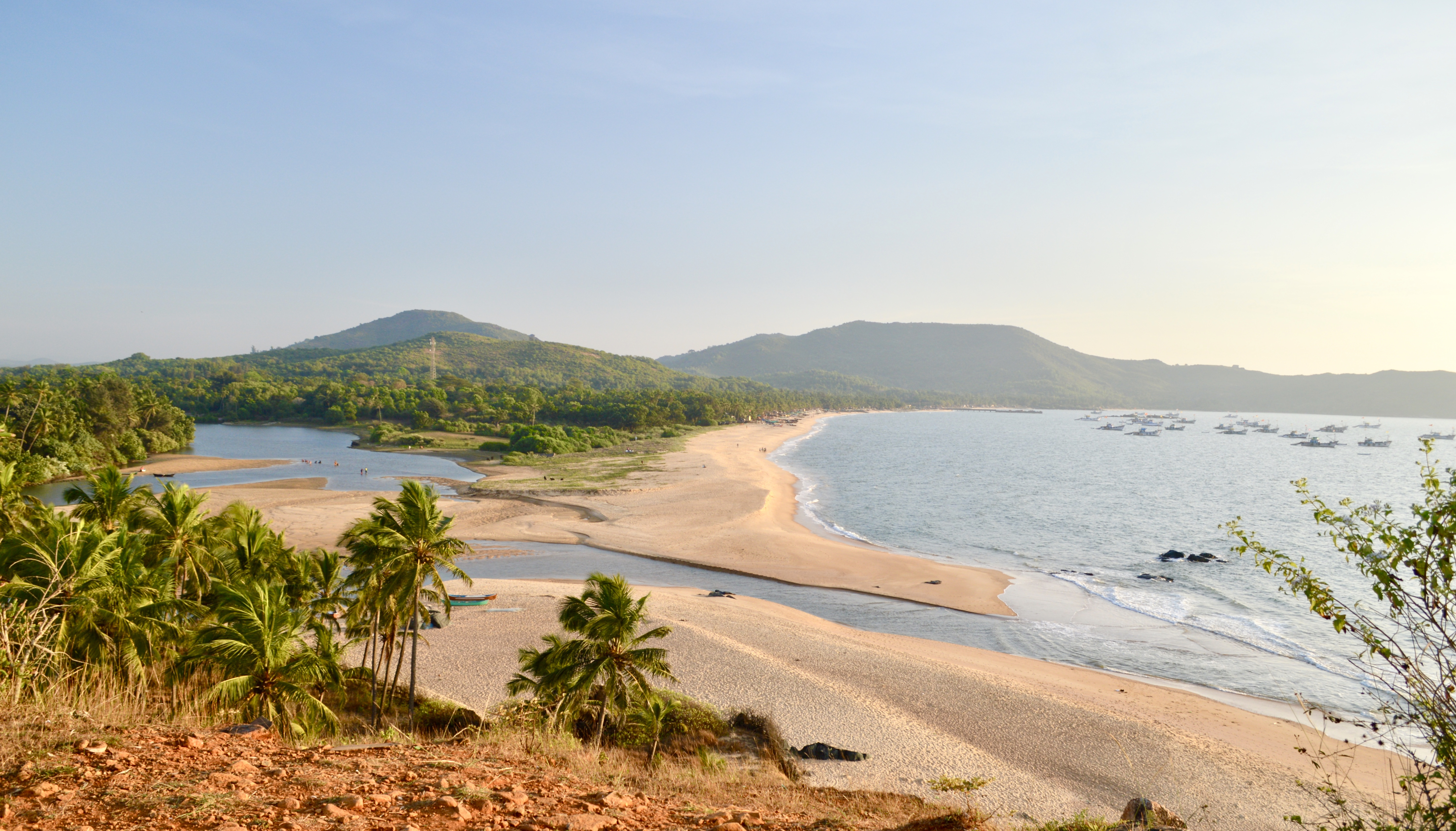
Ankola Beach 2

== Culture ==
=== Folk dance ===
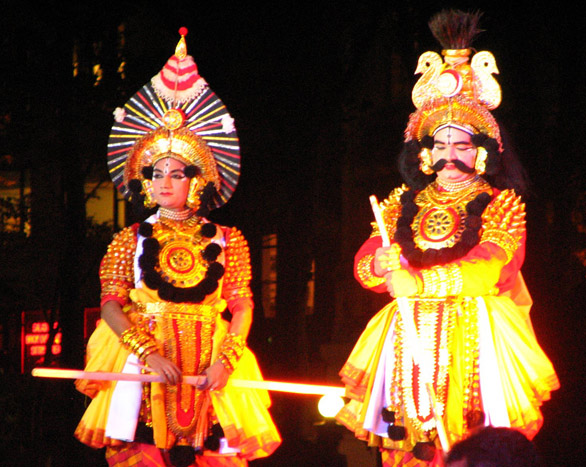
Yakshagana Artists

A popular folk dance in Ankola is Yakshagana.

Suggi kunitha a local seasonal folk dance, has begun in the coastal taluks of Uttara Kannada district. The troupes of the Suggi dancers move from one village to another during the paddy harvest season till the festival of "Holi", to perform the dance as a gratitude to the God for the successful harvest.

The Suggi dancers wear traditional dresses and headgears. The dance has historical background as it was used to create awareness among the masses against the British rule during the Independence movement.

=== Festivals ===
An annual mela called Bandihabba is celebrated on Buddha Poornima in the month of May. This is an important festival to be celebrated for nine days. On the ninth day, Mela is conducted near Shantadurga temple and people from around the town and village throng the temple and celebrate it.

Another festival called 'Karthik' is celebrated during November when five temple deities will be out of Ankola town on Palakki for a night stay and will return next morning.

The Dahikaala (ದಹಿಕಾಲ) festival in Ankola as in Dahi Handi of Maharashtra celebrates the playful and mischievous side of Krishna, where teams of young men form human pyramids to reach a high-hanging pot of butter and break it. This festival is very much important to the Namadharis of Ankola in particular and the teams usually are of Namadhari youth by tradition.

=== Temples ===
Ankola houses many temples such as Honna Raka Temple, Mahamaya, Venkataramana Temple, and Shantadurga (known as Bhumidevathe), Shree Varamahaganapati Temple Shetgeri, Aryaduraga Temple, kuldevi of Mangeshkar Family (Karade Bramhin),Ankola, Eeshwara devasthana. Many Konkani Gaud Saraswat brahmins migrated from Goa in the aftermath of the Portuguese conquest are said to have brought with their Kuladevtas with them. Considering this to be their safe haven, they are said to have established the Kuladevata temples in Ankola. Some of the migrated Goan Deities are Lakshmi Narayan Mahamaya(Nagve Mahmamaya) from the Nagve village in Salcette Goa, Kundodari Mahamaya (Kudteri Mahamaya) from Curtorim in Salcette Goa, and the Aryadurga temple from the Anjediva (Aryadweep) island of Goa.

=== Cuisine ===
Usual diet contains boiled white rice (called Kuchige akki) and fish, basale soppina hulaga in Kannada language (a vegetable sambar) and Koli Asi (chicken curry). Fish is consumed by a large part of population. Kajmiji is a local sweet.

== Transportation ==
Public road transportation to Ankola is handled by North Western Karnataka Road Transport Corporation (NWKRTC). Road transportation is a crucial link for the population. Other modes of transportation such as inland water navigation, are also in use. Railway station is about three km (1.9 mi) from the town.

=== By roads and railways ===
It is well connected to Mangalore and Goa by bus and train. Rail services are fairly regular. Ankola is connected to Bangalore by road. The National Highway 66 (India) passes through Ankola.

- Eastern direction - Connected to Hubli, Hyderabad by National Highway 63.
- Northern direction - Connected to Karwar, Goa by Road and railways.
- Southern direction - Connected to Gokarna, Murdeshwara, Udupi and Mangalore by Road and railways.
- Western direction:Arabian Sea & Beaches.

The rivers offer inland water navigation, usually in traditional ferries or mechanised boats. Hubli to Ankola railway facility has been pushed to the backburner, due to the stay order from Supreme Court of India.

=== Nearest airports ===
- Goa International Airport
- Hubli Airport
- Karwar Airport

=== Ports ===
- Belekeri Port

== Education ==
The city and the taluk has a number of government, government aided and private educational institutions *Nirmala Hridaya High School* Gokhale Centenary College offering various pregraduate, undergraduate and also limited postgraduate courses. In 2007, Government First Grade College was started in Poojageri (two km (1.2 mi) from Ankola.
