= Kumta =

Town in Karnataka

Kumta ಕುಮಟಾ
- Town
- Taluk Map of Kumta
- Location in Karnataka, India
- Coordinates: 14°25′33″N 74°24′42″E
- Country: India
- State: Karnataka
- Region: Kanara
- District: Uttara Kannada

Government
  - Type: Town Municipal Council
  - MLA: Dinakar Keshav Shetty

Area
  - Total: 15.34 km^{2} (5.92 sq mi)
  - Rank: 9th
- Elevation: 2 m (6.6 ft)

Population (2011)
  - Total: 29,266
  - Rank: 3rd in UK
  - Density: 1,957.2/km^{2} (5,069/sq mi)

Languages
  - Official: Kannada
  - Local: Konkani
- Time zone: UTC+5:30 (IST)
- PIN: 581 343
- Telephone code: +91-(0)8386
- Vehicle registration: KA-47
- Literacy: 90.01%
- Sex ratio: 990 ♂/♀
- Lok Sabha Constituency: Uttara Kannada (Lok Sabha constituency)
- Climate: Monsoon (Köppen)
- Website: kumatatown.mrc.gov.in

Kumta or Kumata is a town and taluk in the Uttara Kannada district of Karnataka, India. It is one of the important stations along the Konkan Railway line running between Mumbai and Mangalore.

The 36th Kannada Sahithya Sammelana was held in Kumta in 1956, under the presidency of V. Seetharamaiah.

== Geography ==
The city of Kumta is located on the Arabian Sea coast in the district of North Kannada in the state of Karnataka. Kumta is adjacent to the vast Western Ghats 14.42°N 74.4°E. It has an average elevation of 3 metres (9 feet).

To the north of city, the major Aghanashini river joins the Arabian Sea . The town of Gokarna near Kumta is famous for beaches. A nearby Rock Climbing spot called Yana is also beautiful with its massive black rock formations and nature trails.

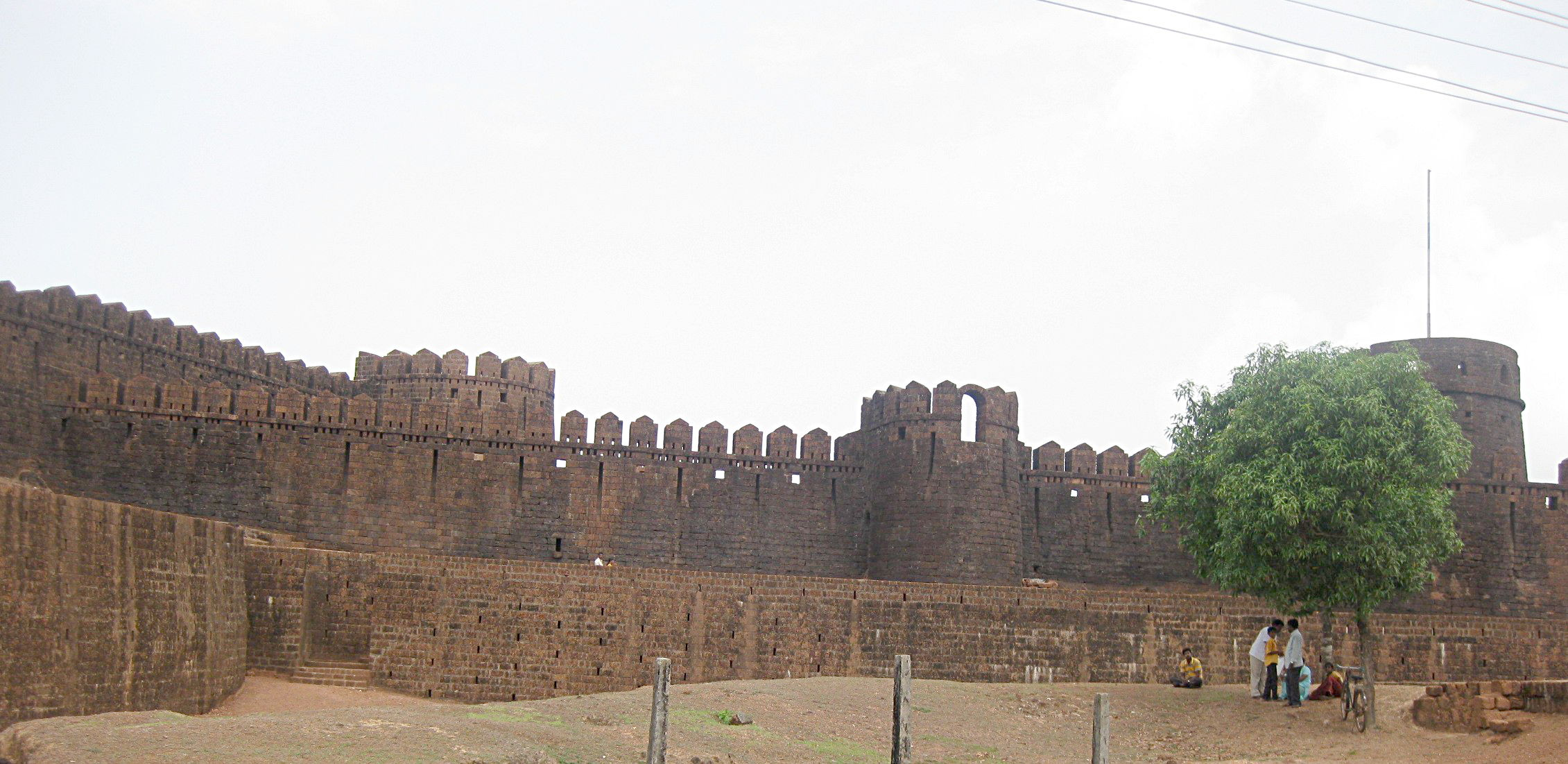
Mirjan Fort, originally built in the 15th century

== Transportation ==
=== Road ===
Kumta is very well connected by road. One of the busiest highway National Highway 66 (NH 66-Panvel-Kochi-Kanyakumari) passes through Kumta. Kumta is also connected to National Highway 766E (kumta to sirsi) and also to Kumta-Siddapur Road (state highway 48)It connects SH 50 siddapur . The halkar village situated in near NH66.

The North Western Karnataka Road Transport Corporation (NWKRTC) is the state run bus service in Kumta.

=== Rail ===
Kumta station is served by the Netravati Express train run by Konkan Railways.

Kumta rail connects Mangalore and Goa which further connects to Bombay. Kumta station is also served by Matsyagandha Express, CSMT Manglore Express and many more

== See also ==
- Hegde (village)
- H. R. Manjanath
- Hegle(village)
