= Karnatak College =

College in Karnataka, India

Karnataka College Dharwad
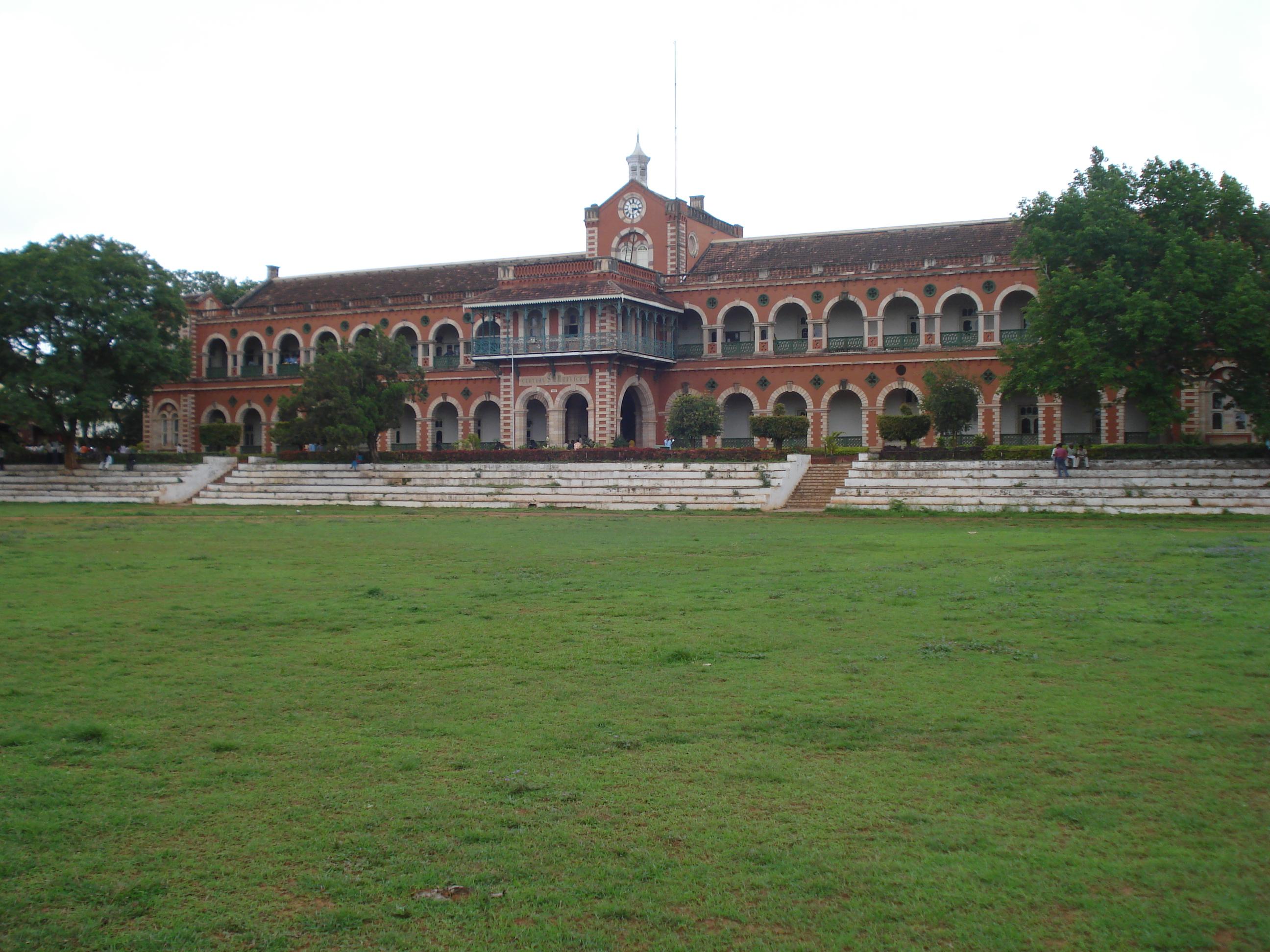
- Former names: Karnatak College Dharwar
- Type: Government college
- Established: 1917; 109 years ago
- Founders: Rudragouda Artal
- Affiliations: Karnataka University Dharwad
- Students: 4000+
- Location: Dharwad, Karnataka, India; 15.453°N 74.999°E
- Website: www.kacd.ac.in

Karnataka College of Arts and Science, Dharwad (1917) is one of the leading institutions in Karnataka, India offering B.A., B.Com. and B.Sc degrees. KCD is the oldest college affiliated to Karnataka University, Dharwad.

== History ==
Karnataka College was founded in June 1917 by Diwan Bahadur Rodda Srinivasaray and Rao Bahadur R. C. Aratal Rudragoudar, with the aim of setting up an educational institution in the region so that students did not need to travel to Bombay or Pune for their studies. Sir. Siddappa Kambli, then the Minister of Education for the Government of Bombay, played a significant role in and was in charge of ensuring that Karnatak College kept offering instruction in the North Karnataka region. The college started with Arts and Science streams, and later other streams like Commerce and Economics were added. The college was later bifurcated for administration purposes as the Karnatak Arts College and Karnatak Science College, though both continue in the same campus and share the amenities.

Originally, it belonged to University of Mumbai. G.S. Paramasivaiah was a student of the Nobel-laureate Sir C. V. Raman was the first Principal of the Karnatak Science College, which was initially part of the college.

== The former principals ==
- G.S. Paramasivaiah
- V. K. Gokak
- T.G.Kalghatgi
- V.Balkrishna

== Events ==
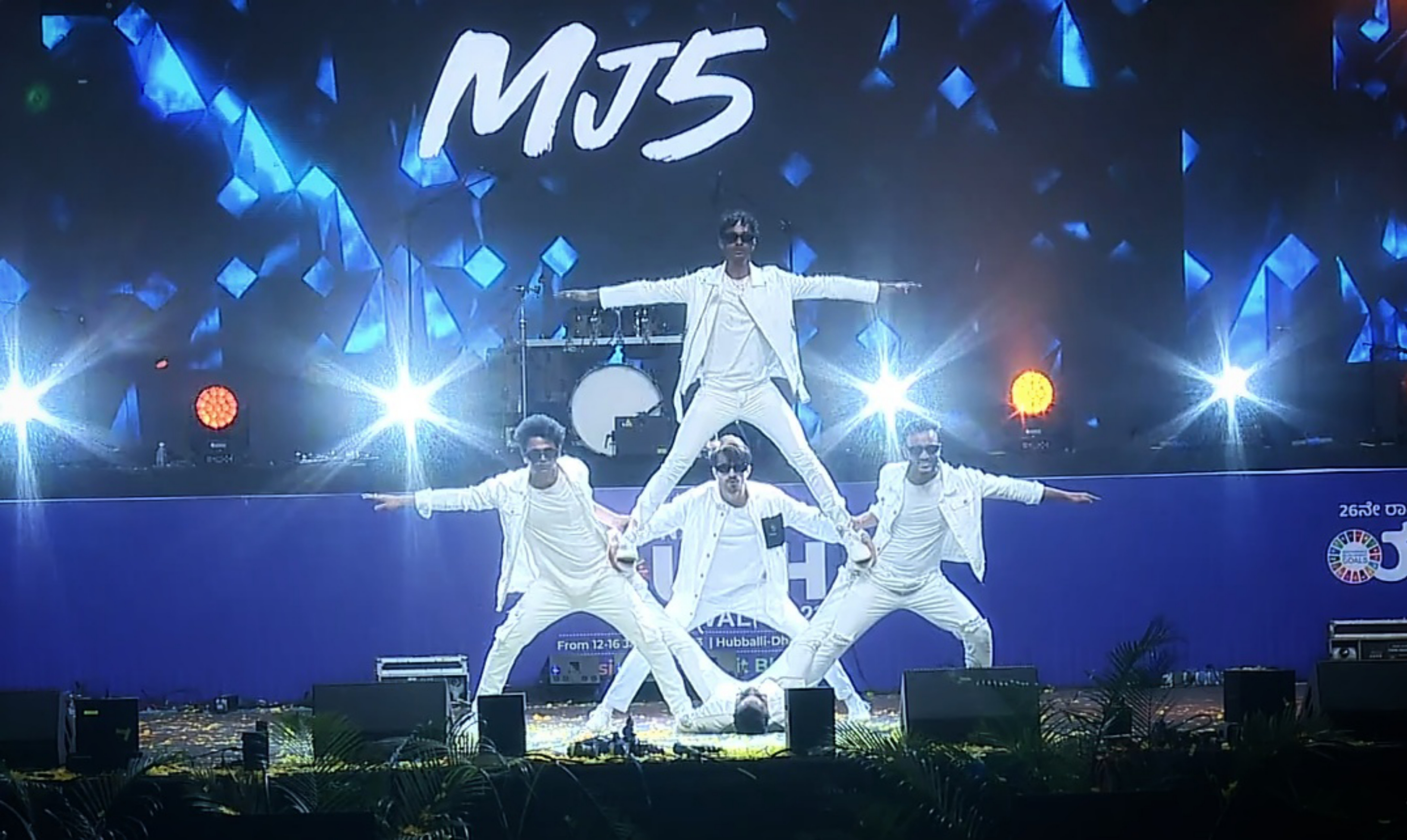
MJ5 dance group performing at KCD during 26th NYF

In January 2023 when Dharwad hosted the 26th National Youth Festival, Karnatak College was the main venue for the 26th annual event of National Youth Festival. Dharwad was the host for the annual fest and KCD was among the 7 venues of the event.

== Notable alumni ==
- P. B. Gajendragadkar
- T. K. Tukol
- D. C. Pavate
- V. K. Gokak
- Girish Karnad
- G. S. Amur
- U. Narayan Bhat
- Ganapati Bhat
- Gangadhar V. Chittal
- B. R. Bhat
- K. S. Amur
- Pandit Vinayak Torvi
- Nandan Nilekani
- Sucheta Dalal
- Shashikala Kakodkar
- Pio Gama Pinto
