= National Mission on Libraries India =

Indian digital library initiative

The National Mission on Libraries India, an initiative of the Ministry of Culture under the Government of India, works to modernise and digitally link nearly 9,000 libraries across India to provide readers access to books and information. The project costs around 1000 crores. The scheme was approved on 28 November 2013 and the President of India, Pranab Mukherjee launched the National Mission on Libraries on 2014, at Rashtrapati Bhavan.

== Background ==
The National Knowledge Commission gave 10 recommendation on libraries in its 2011 report. Based on these recommendations Government of India started the National Mission on Libraries under the Indian Ministry of Culture. The Raja Rammohun Roy Library Foundation (RRRLF), an autonomous body under the Ministry of Culture, and one of several government agencies named for Raja Ram Mohun Roy, is the central agency for the National Mission on Libraries for administrative, logistics, planning and budgeting purposes.

== Working groups ==
Mission has four working groups for its main advisory function. These are:

- Upgrade of existing public libraries, college libraries, school libraries, and shifting the use of school libraries as community libraries chaired by Shri B S Baswan.
- Library and Information Science education, training and research facilities chaired by Professor A. R. D. Prasad.
- Setting up the National Virtual Library, networking and ICT applications in libraries, chaired by Dr. H K Kaul.
- National Census of Libraries, Content Creation and Community Information Centers, chaired by Dr. Subbiah Arunachalam.

== Accomplishments ==
The Capacity Building Program for Library Professionals has been implemented at multiple academic and public libraries, including the Central University of Kerala and Yashwantrao Chavan Maharashtra Open University (YCMOU) in Nashik. It has been found to dramatically improve functioning, scale, and longevity of individual libraries and library systems.

== See also ==
- List of digital library projects
- Mass digitization
