= Bopanna =

Bopanna is a Kodava surname. Notable people with the surname include:

- Daisy Bopanna (born 1982), Indian actress
- P. T. Bopanna (born 1950), Indian author and journalist
- Rohan Bopanna (born 1980), Indian tennis player
