= Karnatak Science College =

University in North Karnataka region, India

Karnatak Science College, Dharwad
- Type: Public university & Research university
- Established: 1917; 109 years ago
- Affiliation: Karnatak University, Dharwad
- Vice-Chancellor: DR. Jayashree S
- Principal: DR.(Smt) M. S. Salunke (Incumbent)
- Location: Dharwad, Karnataka, India; 15.4524°N 74.9988°E
- Campus: Urban
- Website: http://kscd.ac.in/

Karnatak Science College (KSCD), Dharwad, is an educational institute in the North Karnataka region of India. The Karnatak Science College is the Constituent Science College of Karnatak University Dharwad and offers basic and applied courses in science, both at the undergraduate and the pre-university level.

The Karnatak Science College, Dharwad, was originally part of the Karnatak College Dharwad (KCD), which was established in 1917, by the then Government of Bombay. The Karnatak College was established by the painstaking efforts of:

- Diwan Bahaddur S K Rodda (CIE),
- Rao Bahaddur R C Artal and
- Sir Siddappa T Kambli.

Diwan Bahaddur S K Rodda, a member of the Bombay Legislative Council on behalf of Southern Division, for three terms, undertook a vigorous campaign to collect two lakh of Rupees for the foundation of Karnatak College. Rao Bahaddur R C Artal, one of the founders of the Lingayat Education Association, Dharwad, collected one hundred thousand of rupees toward the establishment of the Karnatak College. Sir Siddappa T Kambli, Minister of Education, Government of Bombay, was deeply involved in improving the education facilities in North Karnataka. He was responsible for the transfer of materials, apparatus, equipment and library books from the closed Deccan College, Poona, to the Karnatak College, Dharwad. The staff, students and alumni of Karnatak College (Arts & Science) remember the efforts made by these pioneers by celebrating Founder's day every year.

Karnatak University took over the college in 1958, to be run as a model college, for administrative convenience.

- Late Principal G S Paramasiviah was the first principal of the bifurcated science college and served as Principal from 1958 to 1968.
- Dr. J C Uttangi (1968-1976)
- Prof. H R Ladwa (1976-1981)
- Pujari (1981-1992) &
- Prof. R S Bhoosnurmath (1994-1998) are some of the stalwarts who occupied the post of Principal of Karnatak Science college, Dharwad. Presently, Dr.(Smt) M. S. Salunke, Department of Chemistry is the principal.

== History ==
G. S. Paramasivaiah, who was a student of the Nobel laureate Sir CV Raman, was the first Principal of the Karnatak Science College. He was also the Secretary of KLE Society, Belgaum. He played an important role in founding of Karnatak University.

In 1947, the Government of Bombay Province made attempts to establish a university in Bombay-Karnataka. As per the resolution No. 7914 of the Education and Industries Department, the Government of Bombay, a committee was constituted on 17 April 1947 to make recommendations regarding form, scope, constitution and jurisdiction of a university for Karnataka (which meant Bombay-Karnataka because Bombay-Karnataka was the southern part of Bombay Province). The Lingayat educationists like Prof. G. S. Paramasivaiah along with Prof. S. S. Basavanal and Dr. S. C. Nandimath were associated with the committee. The Karnatak University came into existence in 1949.

The Karnatak College Dharwad (KCD) is considered the nucleus of Karnatak University since the college ran most of the postgraduate (PG) courses in the beginning, before the PG departments were shifted to a new location at Pavatenagar, Dharwad. Research work is going on in several departments, and many of the teaching staff are recognized guides for PhD and MPhil and principal investigators of research projects.

The college has a huge campus, centrally located in Dharwad City, housing several buildings, a botanical garden, and a sports ground. The distinguishing feature of the college is that each department has its own library, reading room, a museum/ storeroom and laboratories.

Students are encouraged to take up extracurricular activities, with the help of the Karnatak Science College Gymkhana. The Gymkhana has various departments, for example:

- Sports Department – including:
  - Cricket,
  - Volleyball,
  - Basketball,
  - Hockey,
  - Indian games,
  - Tennis,
  - Football,
  - Badminton &
  - other indoor games among others;
- Cultural & Youth Festival Department,
- Miscellany Department which brings out the college magazine Varnasaptaka annually,
- Debate & Wallpaper Department, and
- Reading Room department.

The college has a Science Association, in addition to Study Circles in different departments.

== Departments ==
The college has seven departments. Additionally, courses are offered in:

- Industrial Fisheries,
- Biotechnology,
- Microbiology,
- Genetics,
- Electronics and
- Computer Science

(as optional subjects). Computer Science & Electronics subjects are taught in the Department of Physics as optional subjects. There are combinations like:

- PME (Physics, Mathematics, Electronics),
- PMCS (Physics, Mathematics, Computer Science), etc., for a total of 27 combinations. There is an arrangement wherein the faculty from the Languages, Statistics & Mathematics Departments of Karnatak Arts College, Dharwad (KACD) teach courses in the Karnatak Science College, Dharwad (KSCD). This is possible because the Arts & Science Colleges are Constituent Colleges of the Karnatak University, Dharwad, that were bifurcated from the original entity in the region, the famous Karnatak College, Dharwad (KCD).

=== Department of Physics ===
The Department of Physics is housed in a building facing the college road. The department offers Physics, Electronics & Computer Science courses. The Department of Physics was established in 1917 in the undivided Karnatak College, Dharwad (KCD). To keep pace with the latest developments, Electronics was introduced as an optional subject in 1994 and Computer Science in 1995. The department has three lecture halls, five laboratories, an independent library, and one computer lab with internet facility. Some staff members of the Department have taken active interest in applied research.

The department conducts sky watching programs, special lectures, seminars, personality development courses and workshops for students and the general public through the Physics Study Circle (Einstein Study Circle). The Einstein Study Circle, Department of Physics, Karnatak Science College, Dharwad, is involved in activities like arranging lectures and workshops, conducting competitions – quiz, debate, seminars and personality development and people skills program. Students are encouraged to display articles in the wall paper of the Einstein Study Circle, named "COSMOS".

=== Department of Chemistry ===
The Department of Chemistry occupies a major chunk of the main building of the college. In addition to basic chemistry, an undergraduate course on biotechnology is offered. Several of the staff members are active in research and some of them are engaged in guiding PhD students. The department carries out co-curricular activities through the Madame Curie Study Circle.

=== Department of Criminology & Forensic Science ===
This department is housed in the main building, on the first floor. It contains a museum. It is one of the very few places in the country with a well-established, undergraduate course in Forensic Science, with qualified faculty. The department faculty are active in offering consultancy services, from the very beginning. There is a "Criminology Study Circle" in this department.

=== Department of Geology ===
This department is also housed on the first floor of the main building. It has a museum and faculty active in research and consultancy. It has its own "Geology Study Circle".

=== Department of Geography ===
The Department of Geography occupies one of the older buildings of the campus. The department faculty are active in research and writing books. A "Geography Study Circle" is present.

=== Department of Zoology ===
Housed in a separate building, the department has several faculties active in research. Industrial fisheries is one of the subjects introduced here. There is a "Zoology Study Circle". Microbiology is an optional subject introduced at the undergraduate level. The Zoology Department has a very good museum that was established in 1947 by Prof. P. W. Gideon. This zoology museum is one of the best museums in India. At present, Mr. Naveen Pyatimani is the taxidermist/ curator of this museum.

=== Department of Botany ===
The faculty are engaged in research and consultancy, in addition to their teaching duties. There is a "Botany Study Circle". Genetics is one of the optional subjects introduced here.

=== Bachelor of Computer Application & Bachelor of Computer Science ===
The courses Bachelor of Computer Application and Bachelor of Computer Science have been introduced. They are taught in a new BCA/BBA building.

The intake for academic year 2022 for BCA is 120 ( includes two divisions). NEP syllabus is adapted for BCA. It includes well furnished two computer labs.

== Notable alumni ==
- Girish Karnad
