= Arcanum (company) =

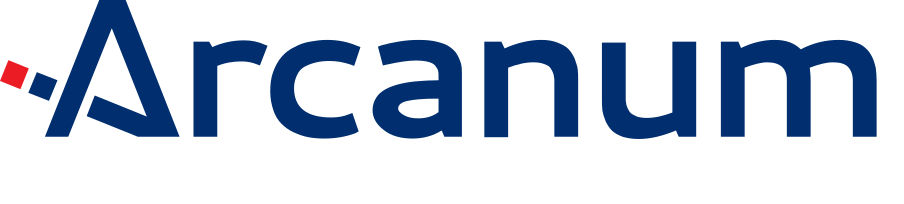
- Company type: Limited company
- Industry: Mass digitization
- Founded: January 1, 1989; 37 years ago
- Founder: Sándor Biszak
- Headquarters: Budapest, Hungary
- Services: Digital libraries
- Number of employees: 25 (2019)
- Website: Official website

Arcanum Adatbázis Kft., often shortened to Arcanum, is a Hungarian company mainly involved in the mass digitization and publication of documents. It was founded in 1989 by Sándor Biszak.

Currently, it operates several digital libraries containing various documents, including books, newspapers, and map, mainly in Hungarian.

== History ==
Sándor Biszak, after graduating as a chemist in 1983, briefly worked in the library of the Kőbánya Pharmaceutical Factory (now known as Gedeon Richter), where he became interested in IT systems and digitization. In the mid-1980s, he joined a cooperative where he worked on databases. On 1 January 1989, he founded his own company, Arcanum, with the initial task of establishing an electronic patent database for the Hungarian Patent Office.

In the early 1990s, Biszak and his colleagues typed the entire text of the Vizsoly Bible and distributed it on floppy disks in 100 copies. They later abandoned floppy disks, and in early 1990, Arcanum became the first Hungarian publisher of CD-ROMs. During this period, while still employing manual typing and proofreading, it issued works including a seven-language Bible, the encyclopedia A Pallas nagy lexikona, the complete works of Mór Jókai and Kálmán Mikszáth, and the contents of the literary journal Nyugat. In total, approximately 300 CDs were issued. Over time, they started publishing on DVDs instead.

Beginning in 2006, working together with Hungarian public institutions, Arcanum turned its focus to the digitization of various kinds of historical documents, including newspapers, books, maps, and archive materials. In the meantime, the company started using increasingly advanced scanning techniques capable of mass digitization, enhanced by the use of optical character recognition software. Biszak stated they were inspired by the scanning techniques used for documents in Google Books.

In 2024, the company had 25 employees. As of 2020, they digitized about 1 to 1.5 million pages per month.

== Collections ==
Arcanum Newspapers (Hungarian: Arcanum Újságok), known until 2024 as Arcanum Digitheca (Hungarian: Arcanum Digitális Tudománytár, ADT), is a searchable online database launched in 2014, chiefly containing scanned copies of newspapers, journals, and encyclopedias. As of January 2024, it comprised 54 million pages. The service runs on a subscription-based model. From 2016 to 2019, the National Program for Electronic Information Service (EISZ) provided free access to the collection to its member organizations, including libraries, educational institutions, and research institutes. Due to a shortage of funding, the partnership was ended in March 2020, although numerous libraries and universities still provide institutional access to the database.

Hungaricana is an online database launched in 2014 that is maintained by the Library of the Hungarian Parliament and operated by Arcanum. It provides free access to the collections of Hungarian public institutions. The digitization of its documents is financed by the National Cultural Fund of Hungary and other institutions. By April 2024, around 20 million pages were made available on the website.

Arcanum Reference Library (Hungarian: Arcanum Kézikönyvtár) is a digital collection of various reference works previously published by Arcanum on CDs and DVDs. Szaktárs is a subscription-based online library containing works of specialized literature. In 2024, it provided access to the books of 25 Hungarian publishing houses, amounting to almost 10 million pages of text.
