= Suraj Unniappan =

Canadian comparative endocrinologist and academic

- Citizenship: Canadian
- Education: University College, Thiruvananthapuram (B.S.); University of Kerala (M.S.); University of Alberta (Ph.D.)
- Scientific career
- Fields: Comparative endocrinology, Neuroendocrinology, Metabolism, Reproductive biology
- Workplaces: University of Saskatchewan
- Thesis: (2004)
- Doctoral advisor: Richard E. Peter

Suraj Unniappan is a Canadian comparative endocrinologist and academic. He is a professor in the Department of Veterinary Biomedical Sciences at the Western College of Veterinary Medicine, University of Saskatchewan, and holds the Centennial Enhancement Chair in Comparative Endocrinology. His research focuses on neuroendocrine regulation of metabolism and reproduction across vertebrates, including fish and mammals.

According to Google Scholar, his publications have received more than 6,700 citations, and he has an h-index of 43 and an i10-index of 91.

== Early life and education ==
Unniappan completed Bachelor of Science degree at University College, Thiruvananthapuram, followed by a Master of Science degree from the Department of Zoology, University of Kerala. He earned a Ph.D. in biological sciences (cell biology and physiology) from the University of Alberta in 2004.

== Academic career ==
Unniappan became a faculty member and a Canadian Institutes of Health Research New Investigator at York University, Toronto. He joined the University of Saskatchewan as a professor in the Western College of Veterinary Medicine. He has served as the director of the Endocrine Service Laboratory.

== Research ==
Unniappan's research is in the field of comparative endocrinology, with an emphasis on the integration of metabolic and reproductive processes. His laboratory has investigated neuroendocrine signalling pathways in vertebrates, particularly in fish models such as zebrafish and goldfish.

His work has identified physiological roles of peptide hormones, including nesfatin-1 and related peptides derived from nucleobindin proteins.

== Awards and honours ==
- Yoshitaka Nagahama Lectureship and Award in Fish Endocrinology, International Society of Fish Endocrinology
- Grace Pickford Medal in Comparative Endocrinology, International Federation of Comparative Endocrinology Societies
- Bob Boutilier New Investigator Award, Canadian Society of Zoologists
- Early Investigator Award, The Endocrine Society, USA
