= Dharwad Institute of Mental Health and Neurosciences =

Public medical institution in Karnataka, India

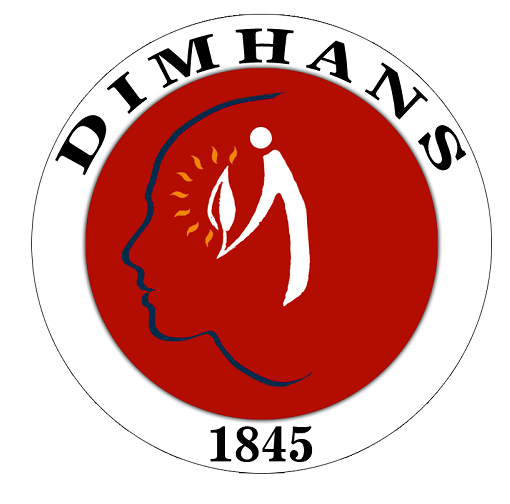
- Official insignia of the institute
- Established: 1845; 181 years ago, as Lunatic Asylum; 1922; 104 years ago, as Mental Hospital; 2 February 2009; 17 years ago, as DIMHANS
- Affiliations: National Medical Commission
- Academic affiliations: Rajiv Gandhi University of Health Sciences
- Director: Dr. Arunkumar Chavan
- Location: Dharwad, Karnataka, India
- Website: dimhans.karnataka.gov.in/en

Dharwad Institute of Mental Health and Neurosciences (DIMHANS) is a public medical institution in Dharwad, Karnataka, India, which provides healthcare facilities specializing in Mental Health, Psychiatry and Neuroscience. Additionally, DIMHANS offers several Post-Graduate academic programs.

== History ==
DIMHANS started as a "Lunatic Asylum" in 1845 in the premises of a jail. In 1885, some rooms of the jail were started to be used as wards for keeping patients. In the year 1909, the asylum was separated from the jail and a wall around the asylum was constructed. In 1922, the British Government declared the asylum to be a “Government Mental Hospital”. In 1993, with the intention of reducing the stigma attached to the name, the name of the hospital was changed from “Government Mental Hospital” to “Karnataka Institute of Mental Health" (KIMH). Based on the recommendations of the D. M. Nanjundappa report on correction of regional disparities in Karnataka, the institute was converted into an autonomous post-graduation training institute and renamed as Dharwad Institute of Mental Health and Neurosciences (DIMHANS) during a legislative assembly session in 2009.

In 2011, several proposals were sent to the state government to upgrade DIMHANS's ageing infrastructure.

In 2020, a COVID-19 testing center was started at DIMHANS. DIMHANS has emerged as a major testing facility in North Karnataka for COVID-19.

In November 2021, the Karnataka High Court gave an ultimatum to the state government to upgrade DIMHANS to a higher center for psychiatry and to provide MRI machines by March 1, 2022. In the same month, a new building "Bendre Block", CT Scan facilities were inaugurated.

== Organization and administration ==
=== Departments ===
DIMHANS has following departments:

- Psychiatry
- Clinical Psychology
- Psychiatric Social Work
- Psychiatric Nursing
- Neuroanaesthesia

=== Centres ===
- Child and Adolescent Psychiatry
- Addiction Psychiatry
- Cognitive Neurosciences

== Academics ==
=== Programmes ===
DIMHANS is affiliated to RGUHS & offers following courses

- MD in Psychiatry
- MPhil in Clinical Psychology
- MPhil in Psychiatric Social Work
- MSc in Psychiatric Nursing
- Post Basic Diploma in Psychiatric Nursing

== Services and facilities ==
DIMHANS provides Day-care and Psychiatric Rehabilitation services. Day-care and psychiatric rehabilitation services was established to help persons with chronic and disabling mental disorders to return to an optimal level of functioning. DIMHANS runs a Mental Health Program across Karnataka to raise awareness among people about Mental Illnesses and reduce stigma surrounding Mental Health problems. DIMHANS also provide free legal advice and De-addiction services.
