= Murder of Neha Hiremath =

- Date: 18 April 2024; 2 years ago
- Location: BVB College, Hubballi, India
- Type: Murder by stabbing

Neha Hiremath was a 23 year old woman, who was stabbed to death by classmate Fayaz Khondunaik at KLE Technological University on Thursday, April 18, 2024. In February 2025 the victim's family requested intervention from the Central Bureau of Investigation due to lack of progress in the investigation.

== Background ==
Neha Hiremath was the daughter of Congress councillor of Hubballi-Dharwad Municipal Corporation (HDMC) Niranjan Hiremath. She was studying Computer Science at BVB College Hubballi, Karnataka. Fayaz was also studying in her class and her father said that he was approaching her to marry him, but she had denied it.

== Murder ==
On April 18, 2024, at around 4:30 PM, when Hiremath was coming out of her class in the BVB College campus, her classmate Fayaz suddenly approached her and stabbed her numerous times before fleeing the scene. She was taken to the nearby hospital for treatment eventually succumbed to her injuries. Police later arrested the accused person Fayaz and FIR has been registered.

An autopsy report was released on April 23, 2024. It was determined that Hiremath suffered from fourteen wounds around her neck, heart, and back—she had died within a minute of the attack.

== Aftermath ==
On Sunday, April 21, 2024, BJP Party in Karnataka called for statewide protest on Monday, April 22, 2024 over Hiremath's death. Muslim organisations have also given a call for a 'bandh' (strike) on Monday, condemning the murder of 23-year-old college student Neha Hiremath in Hubballi.

A bandh was observed on Monday, April 22, 2024 in Hubballi - Dharawad in solidarity with the victim's family.

== Investigation ==
On April 22, 2024, Karnataka Chief Minister Siddaramaiah has said the investigation into the murder of Hubballi student, Neha Hiremath, will be handed over to the Criminal Investigation Department (CID).

On April 24, 2024, the accused was sent to a 6-day Criminal Investigation Department (CID) custody.

On May 27, 2024, senior CID officer met the family of Neha Hiremath in Hubballi and assured them of justice.

84 days after the murder, investigation team digs out 99 pieces of evidence for the murder case.
