= K. S. Amur =

Indian mathematician

- Born: 1931; India
- Died: September 8, 2018 (aged 86–87); Dharwad, India
- Citizenship: (India) Indian
- Education: Karnataka University
- Occupation: Professor of Mathematics
- Scientific career
- Fields: Differential Geometry
- Workplaces: Karnataka University, University of North Carolina at Chapel Hill
- Doctoral advisor: C. N. S. Iyengar

Krishna Shyamacharya Amur (born 1931) was a professor emeritus of mathematics in differential geometry was head of the department of mathematics, Karnatak University, Dharwar. Amur was vice-president of Karnatak Education Board, Dharwar. and a brother of G. S. Amur.

Born and raised in Suranagi village of Haveri taluka, he earned a M.Sc. and a Ph.D. (1964) in mathematics from the Karnataka University, Dharwar.

Amur was a postdoctoral fellow at the department of mathematics, University of North Carolina at Chapel Hill, from 1967 to 1968 and again in 1984, he went to the USA on a fellowship program for a year. He was also acting registrar of the Karnatak University, Dharwar from 1978-80.

Amur was the President of Sri Aurobindo society, Karnataka State.
