= Hosmane =

Hosmane is an Indian surname. Notable people with the surname include:

- Narayan Sadashiv Hosmane (born 1948), Indian-born American cancer research scientist
- Ramachandra S. Hosmane (born 1944), Indian chemist
