= Srinivas Kishanrao Saidapur =

Indian reproductive biologist (born 1947)

- Born: 17 July 1947 (age 79); Karnataka, India
- Education: Karnatak University; University of Kansas; University of Mainz
- Known for: Comparative endocrinology of amphibians Reproductive biology of the vertebrates
- Awards: 1991 Shanti Swarup Bhatnagar Prize
- Scientific career
- Fields: Reproductive biology
- Workplaces: Karnatak University; National Institute for Basic Biology; Ruhr University Bochum; University of Würzburg

Srinivas Kishanrao Saidapur (born 17 July 1947) is an Indian reproductive biologist, academic and a former vice chancellor of Karnatak University. He is known for his studies on comparative endocrinology of amphibians and the reproductive biology of the vertebrates and is an elected fellow of the Indian Academy of Sciences, Indian National Science Academy, National Academy of Sciences, India and The World Academy of Sciences. The Council of Scientific and Industrial Research, the apex agency of the Government of India for scientific research, awarded him the Shanti Swarup Bhatnagar Prize for Science and Technology, one of the highest Indian science awards, in 1991, for his contributions to biological sciences.

== Biography ==
Srinivas Saidapur, born on 17 July 1947 in the South Indian state of Karnataka, did all his college education, except the post-doctoral studies, at Karnatak University from where he secured his graduate, master's and doctoral degrees. After completing his master's degree, he joined the university as a lecturer of zoology in 1972 and spent his entire academic career there, superannuating in 2010. In between, he obtained his PhD in 1974 and did his post-doctoral studies at University of Kansas Hospital during 1976–79 and on an Alexander von Humboldt Fellowship, he did research at University of Mainz during 1989–90. At Karnatak University, he served as a professor from 1988 till he was appointed as the vice chancellor of the university in 2006, a post he held till 2010. He also served as a visiting scientist at the National Institute for Basic Biology, Japan and had two short stints in Germany at Ruhr University Bochum in 1995 and University of Würzburg in 2004 as an INSA-DFG Exchange Program fellow of the Indian National Science Academy and Deutsche Forschungsgemeinschaft (DFG).

Focusing his researches on comparative endocrinology of amphibians, Saidapur explained the different types of reproductive processes followed by the tropical anurans and their control mechanisms. His studies are reported to have widened the understanding of the reproductive biology of the vertebrates and concentrating his researches on Indian Bullfrog, he proposed gametogenesis methodologies for producing frogs of predetermined sex. His studies also covered the behavioral ecology of anuran tadpoles and agamid lizards with regard to their foraging techniques, food identification, kin detection and predator-prey relationships and he developed new ways for the captive breeding of reptiles. On the academic front, it was under his leadership Karnatak University introduced new academic courses on molecular biology, animal behavior and evolutionary biology. He is a former member of the INSA council and served as its vice president during 2012–14. He has also published several articles (Note: Please see Selected bibliography section) and has mentored 13 scholars in their doctoral researches.

== Awards and honors ==
The Council of Scientific and Industrial Research awarded Saidapur the Shanti Swarup Bhatnagar Prize, one of the highest Indian science awards, in 1991. Two years later, the Indian Academy of Sciences elected him as a fellow and the Indian National Science Academy followed suit, a year later. He received the fellowships of the National Academy of Sciences, India and The World Academy of Sciences in 2009 and 2010 respectively. He has also delivered many award orations which included the 2007 Professor MRN Prasad Memorial Lecture and 2010 Professor Har Swarup Memorial Lecture.

== Selected bibliography ==
- Madgiri, Pancharatna and Saidapur, Srinivas Kishanrao. (1985). Effects of homoplastic pituitary pars dista1is homogenate (PDH), PMSG, HCG, GH, and estradiol-17B on the ovarian maintenance in the hypophysectomized frog, Rana cyanoph1yctis (Schn.). Zool. Anz., Jena 215:1/2, 109–120.
- Srinivas Kishanrao Saidapur, Ravishankar Dundappa Kanamadi and Narayan Ummanna Bhuttewadkar (December 1989). "Variations in the Fat Body Mass in the Male Frog, Rana cyanophlyctis". Journal of Herpetology. 23 (4): 461–463. doi:10.2307/1564070. JSTOR 1564070.
- Ravishankar Dundappa Kanamadi and Srinivas Kishanrao Saidapur (December 1991). "Effect of Sublethal Concentration of Mercuric Chloride on the Ovary of the Frog Rana cyanophlyctis". Journal of Herpetology. 25 (4): 494–497. doi:10.2307/1564779. JSTOR 1564779.
- Ravishankar Dundappa Kanamadi and Srinivas Kishanrao Saidapur (December 1992). "Effects of Exposure to Sublethal Mercuric Chloride on the Testis and Fat Body of the Frog Rana cyanophlyctis". Journal of Herpetology. 26 (4): 499–501. doi:10.2307/1565130. JSTOR 1565130.

== See also ==
- Comparative endocrinology
- Gametogenesis
- Behavioral ecology
- Foraging
