= Bhaskar Maiya =

Indian writer, author, scholar, translator, and professor (died 2021)

- Born: 1950/1951
- Died: 6 May 2021; Udupi, Mangalore, Karnataka
- Occupations: writer, author, scholar, translator and professor
- Notable work: Ajanabeepan Ek Saiddanthik Anushilan
- Awards: Sahitya Akademi Award Award (2002)

Bhaskar Maiya also Gundmi Bhaskar Maiya or Bhasker Mayya (1950/1951 – 6 May 2021) was an Indian writer, author, scholar, translator and professor. He was well known for his progressive style of writing.

== Career ==
He pursued doctorate in Hindi-language and obtained master's degree in Philosophy, Sanskrit, Prakrit and English from the Karnatak University in Dharwad. He also completed his PhD at Mysore University. He was academically fluent and had done research on Hindi, Kannada, Sanskrit and English. He had published nearly 52 books out of which 20 of them being written in Hindi while 32 of them being written in Kannada.

Maiya also served as Hindi-language professor for a long period of time, nearly two decades teaching Hindi at Bhandarkars' Arts & Science College in Kundapur. He then served as the head of Department of Hindi from 2010 to 2012. He also later taught Sanskrit to students.

He received the Kendra Sahitya Akademi Award in 2002 from the then Indian Prime minister Atal Bihari Vajpayee for his book titled Ajanabeepan Ek Saiddanthik Anushilan.

== Death ==
Maiya died on 6 May 2021, at the age of 70 in Udupi, Mangalore due to COVID-19 complications and cardiac arrest. He was hospitalized about four days prior to his death as he was undergoing treatment at a private hospital in Bramavara, Udupi.
