= Shobhan Bantwal =

Indian American writer

Shobhan Bantwal (born 1951) is an Indian American writer. She is a recipient of the Golden Leaf Award for Best Debut Book.

== Early life and education ==
Bantwal was born in Belgaum, India to a large Hindu family. She studied sociology at Karnatak University in Dharwad, and earned both her bachelor's and master's degrees there. Bantwal married her husband in an arranged marriage and the couple moved to New Jersey in the United States in 1974. She continued her studies in the U.S., and received an M.A. in Public Administration from Rider University. After completing that degree, Bantwal began a job at the New Jersey Department of Labor, where she would work for the next 19 years. She currently resides in Arizona.

== Career ==
Bantwal began writing in 2002 at the age of 50. Her books include The Dowry Bride (2007), The Forbidden Daughter (2008), The Sari Shop Widow (2009), The Unexpected Son (2010), The Full Moon Bride (2011), and The Reluctant Matchmaker (2012), all published by Kensington Books. Her books have been published in India by Fingerprint Publishing. She writes stories about contemporary Indian women and romance, and has described her style as "Bollywood in a book". Bantwal's plots feature women's issues like arranged marriages, cross-cultural stories from the Indian diaspora, and New Jersey settings. She has received some criticism for her focus on commercial and genre fiction, but she sees her books as a useful way to introduce a consciousness of cultural issues, especially those that affect women, to large audiences. Bantwal's short stories have been published in Romantic Times, India Abroad, Little India, India Currents, and New Woman.

== Awards ==
She won the Golden Leaf Award for Best Debut Book in 2008.
