= KLE Technological University =

Private university in Karnataka, India

Coordinates: 15°22′6″N 75°7′23″E

Karnatak Lingayat Education Technological University
- Former names: B. V. Bhoomaraddi College of Engineering and Technology
- Motto: Creating Value, Leveraging Knowledge
- Type: Private
- Established: 1947; 79 years ago
- Affiliations: UGC
- Chancellor: Prabhakar Kore
- Vice-Chancellor: Dr. Prakash Tewari
- Academic staff: 204
- Undergraduates: 3,500
- Postgraduates: 120
- Location: Hubli-Dharwad, Karnataka, 580031, India
- Campus: Urban area 64 acres (260,000 m^{2})
- Website: www.kletech.ac.in

Karnatak Lingayat Education Technological University (KLETU) is a private university in Hubballi-Dharwad, Karnataka, India. It was upgraded to a university under the KLE Technological University Act, 2012. The institute was founded by the KLE Society, Belagavi, in 1947. The University Chancellor, Pro-Chancellor and Vice-Chancellor are Dr. Prabhakar Kore, Dr. Ashok Shettar and Dr. Prakash Tewari respectively.

The university has three constituent institutes under it -

1.Hubballi Campus [Formerly known as B.V. Bhoomraddi College of Engineering & Technology(BVBCET)]

2.Belagavi Campus (Dr. M.S. Sheshgiri College of Engineering & Technology)

3.Bengaluru Law College

Hubballi campus being the Main Campus.

== History ==
KLE Technological University (formerly BVBCET) was established by the Karnatak Lingayat Education Society (KLE Society) in 1947. It owes its original name to the businessman-philanthropist Shri Basappa Veerappa Bhoomaraddi. It began as a polytechnic in Gadag but shifted to Hubballi in 1948 and upgraded itself to a college. Until 1972, it offered only diploma and undergraduate degree programs. Later, it offered 12 undergraduate programs and eight postgraduate programs besides research programs in seven disciplines. It was affiliated to the Visvesvaraya Technological University, Belagavi and its undergraduate programs were accredited by the National Board of Accreditation (NBA) of the All India Council for Technical Education. In 2015 Karnatak Lingayat Education Society acquired B.V Bhoomaraddi to form KLE Technological University.

Current annual student intake for Undergraduate & Post Graduate programmes is in excess of 1200.

== Academics ==
The university offers 8 undergraduate programs, 7 postgraduate programs and research programs in seven disciplines.

=== Undergraduate programs ===
- School of Mechanical Engineering
- School of Civil Engineering
- School of Computer Science and Engineering - SoCSE
- School of Electronics & Communication Engineering - SoECE

=== Incubation Centres ===
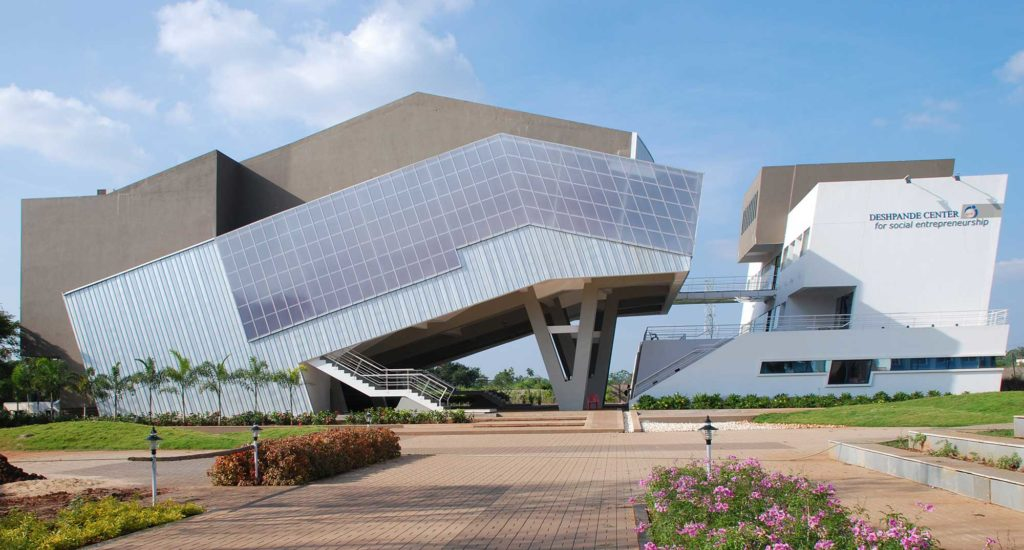
Deshpande Foundation, Deshpande Center for Social Entrepreneurship

==== Centre for Technology Innovation and Entrepreneurship - CTIE ====
Centre for Technology Innovation and Entrepreneurship - CTIE, at BVB Campus, KLE Technological University, was established in 2012 and has been providing space, mentorship, technical support and access to labs for tech start-ups through the incubation model.

CTIE works closely with the Centre for Innovation and Product Development (CIPD) as a feeder of commercially feasible technology ideas. CIPD has a vision to promote product development competency in engineering students. It ensures multi-disciplinary approach to connect to students from various engineering and business streams to work together. CTIE has its branch in Belagavi Campus along with all facilities that are available in Hubballi campus as well.

==== VLSI/ ESDM Incubation Centre ====
A VLSI/ESDM incubation centre to promote startups in this sector was opened at the KLE Tech Park at KLE Technological University (KLETU) in Hubballi on July 17, 2018.

Karnataka Biotechnology & Information Technology Services (KBITS), Indian Electronics & Semiconductors Association (IESA) and KLETU have come together to develop this facility to support entrepreneurs in the emerging sector of VLSI/ ESDM (Very Large Scale Integration/ Electronics System Design and Manufacturing). IT-BT, Science & Technology and Large & Medium Industries Minister K J George inaugurated the centre on July 17, 2018. IT-BT Department Principal Secretary Gaurav Gupta, IESA Working President Anilkumar M, KLETU Vice Chancellor Ashok Shettar, Deshpande Foundation founder Gururaj Deshpande, Deshpande Foundation CEO Vivek Pawar, KLE Society director Shankaranna Munavalli and others were present.

== Industry linkages ==
- Sankalp Semiconductor has a branch office within the university premises and works with the Electronics and Communications Department.
- Navya Biological has a Process Development Centre within the university premises and works with the Biotechnology Department.
- IBM Software Centre of Excellence has created a group with the aim of improving the technical skills of the students.
- Bosch Center of Competence for Automation Technologies is in the campus.
- Altair Engineering India has partnered with KLE Technological University to set up the Altair Design Innovation Center (ADIC) at the KLE Technological University Hubballi campus.
- Samsung has set up Student Ecosystem for Engineered Data (SEED) Lab for artificial intelligence (AI), machine learning (ML), and data engineering at the KLE Technological University, Hubballi.

== Rankings ==
University and college rankings

Engineering – India
- NIRF (2024): 151-200

The National Institutional Ranking Framework (NIRF) ranked it between 151-200 among engineering colleges in 2024.

The University got a 'Band A' (Rank Between 6th – 25th) rating from the Atal Ranking of Institutions Innovation Achievement (ARIIA).

== Campus ==
Spread over 64 acres (260,000 m^{2}), the campus has buildings with varied architecture, comprising classrooms, laboratories and hostel facilities for boys and girls.

== Notable alumni ==
- Basavaraj Bommai
- Gopal Gaonkar
- Sudha Murthy
- S. R. Hiremath
- Vivek Kulkarni
- Anil Sahasrabudhe
