= Vasant K. Prabhu =

Dr. Vasant K. Prabhu is a professor in the Electrical Engineering department at the University of Texas at Arlington. He has taught at UTA since 1991. He specializes in teaching and researching digital communication systems.

In 1958, Prabhu received his Bachelor of Science degree from Karnatak University. He also received a Bachelor of Engineering degree from the Indian Institute of Science in 1962, a Master of Science degree from the Massachusetts Institute of Technology in 1963, and a Doctor of Science in 1966. He is a Life Fellow of the IEEE and a recipient of the Alfred Hay Gold medal from the Indian Institute of Science (1961), the Centennial Medal of IEEE (1984), and the Robert Q. Lee Excellence in Teaching award from UTA (1998). He has more than 30 years of experience as member of the technical staff at Bell Labs. In 1986, we was elevated to the grade of IEEE fellow for contribution to interference, noise, and spectral analysis of analog and digital communications systems.
