= Rudragouda Artal =

Rao Bahadur Rudragouda Aratal
- Born: 1851

Rao Bahadur Rudragouda C. Aratal (1851 – 4 October 1932) was an Indian civil servant who was Deputy Collector of Belgaum in the British Raj. He is also a founder of the Karnatak Lingayat Education Society, which was established in 1916. One of the revenue administrative report praises Aratal for fighting corruption, stating, "The entire credit of eradicating corruption from the Revenue department, goes to Rao Bahaddur R.C. Aratal."

== Literary works ==
- The Village Goddess Dyamavva
- Basawis(Rain) in Peninsular India
- Life and work in Indigenous Schools

== Recognition ==
Late Indian scholar M M Kalburgi has authored a book named Aratal Rudragoudara Charitre on the life story of Rudragouda Aratal. The book has been published by Prasaranga division of Karnatak Lingayat Education Society, Belgaum.

== Death ==
He died on 4 October 1932 in Belagavi.
