= Prabhakar Kore =

Indian politician

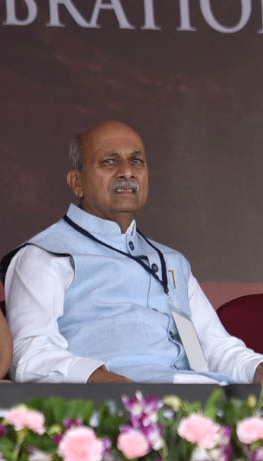
- At a function of KLE education society

Member of the Rajya Sabha
- In office 2008–2020
- Succeeded by: Eranna Kadadi
- Constituency: Karnataka

Personal details
- Born: 1 August 1947 (age 79) Ankali
- Party: Bharatiya Janata Party
- Spouse: Smt. Asha
- Children: 2 daughters, 1 son
- Education: B.Com.
- Occupation: Chairman of KLE Society, and chancellor of KAHER Belagavi
- Profession: Educationist

Prabhakar Kore is an Indian politician and former three term member of Rajya Sabha from Karnataka. He is a member of the Bharatiya Janata Party. He is the Chairman of the Karnatak Lingayat Education Society, Belagavi which runs over 300 institutions that provide education and healthcare in Karnataka and Maharashtra, India. He is also the Chancellor of KLE Academy of Higher Education and Research (KAHER), Belagavi and KLE Technological University, Hubballi.

He has made significant contributions in education, agriculture, healthcare, the cooperative sector, politics, and community welfare, leaving a mark on the state, national, and international stages. He served as a Member of Parliament in the Rajya Sabha three times: from 1990 to 1996, 2008 to 2014, and 2014 to 2020. Additionally, he has been involved in various parliamentary committees, including those for the Ministry of Defense, Human Resource Development, Health and Family Welfare, Consultative Committee, Education, and Railways, among others.

Kore also served as a member of the Legislative Council of Karnataka from 2001 to 2007. His role as an educationist is underscored by his efforts in expanding the KLE Society, which was established in 1984 with 38 institutes, to its current count of 308 institutes. He is also known as an industrialist.

== Early life ==
Prabhakar Kore was born on 1 August 1947 in Ankali. to Shri Basavaprabhu and Smt Sharadadevi. Kore belongs to the Banajiga sub-sect of Lingayat community. He completed a Bachelor of Commerce (B.Com) degree before beginning his career. He currently holds numerous awards conferred by various international and national organizations. He began his career as the chairman of the KLE Society.

=== Political accomplishments ===
Prabhakar Kore has had a distinguished career, serving as a three-time Member of Parliament in the Rajya Sabha from 1990 to 1996, 2008 to 2014, and 2014 to 2020. He has been actively involved in various Parliamentary Committees, including those for the Ministry of Defence, Human Resource Development, Health and Family Welfare, Consultative Committee, Education, Railways, Hindi Prasara, Planning, Agriculture, Skill Development & Entrepreneurship, Transport, Tourism & Culture, Food Consumer Affairs & Public Distribution, Urban Development, and Energy, Subordinate Legislation, among others. He also served as an official member of the delegation during the State visit of Shri Pranab Mukherjee, the Honourable President of India, to Belgium and Turkey in 2013, and accompanied the Honourable Vice-President, Dr. Hamid Ansari, on a visit to Hungary and Algeria in 2016. Prabhakar Kore has also participated in an Indian Parliamentarian Study visit to Indonesia. From 2001 to 2007, he was a member of the Karnataka Legislative Council. Currently, he serves as the Vice-President of the All India Veerashaiva Mahasabha in Bengaluru and is a member of the Karnataka Veerashaiva-Lingayat Development Corporation (KVLDC).

=== As an educationist ===
Since 1984, Prabhakar Kore has served as Chairman of the KLE Society in Belagavi. Under his visionary leadership, KLE has expanded from 38 institutions to a globally renowned organization encompassing more than 300 institutions with 145,000 students. His contributions span across education, healthcare, research, and agriculture. He established the multidisciplinary KAHER – KLE Academy of Higher Education and Research (Deemed-to-be-University) in Belagavi in 2006 and KLE Technological University (KLE TECH) in Hubballi in 2015. Prabhakar Kore has also driven advancements in medical, pharmaceutical, biotechnological research through a cutting-edge Research Centre at the KAHER Campus. Additionally, he set up two Community Radio Stations in Hubballi and Belagavi and introduced state-of-the-art English Medium Schools in rural areas like Ankali, Chikodi, Athani, Gokak, Nipani, Saundatti, and Malur. His initiatives include KAHER's partnership with the Khelo India initiative by the Government of India to promote Judo, Badminton, and Swimming, focusing on training athletes for the Olympics.

=== Contributions to healthcare and community welfare ===
Prabhakar Kore has revolutionized healthcare in North Karnataka and surrounding areas through significant initiatives. He established a state-of-the-art 2400-bed Hospital & Medical Research Centre, which serves as a recognized organ donation center and annually accommodates about 70,000 inpatients and 9 Lakhs outpatients. The hospital includes a 1200-bed Charitable section dedicated to providing healthcare services to the poor and needy. Additionally, Dr. Kore established the 500-bed KLE Centenary Charitable Hospital on Yellur Road, Belagavi, extending affordable healthcare services to villages around Belagavi. He also set up Satellite Health Centers in Hubballi, Gokak, Bailhongal, Nipani, Ankola (North Canara District), and Intensive Care Units (ICUs) in Hubballi, Gokak, and Chikodi. Further contributions include the establishment of KLE's Ayurveda Hospital for promoting treatment and research in traditional medicine, and the initiation of an ultra-modern Cancer Hospital in Belagavi. Dr. Kore's vision also led to the establishment of Jagadguru Gangadhar Murusavirmath Medical College and KLE Hospital in Hubballi, expanding healthcare capacity to over 4000 beds across Tier-II cities and villages. His efforts have placed KLE on the global healthcare map through research collaborations with institutions like the National Institute of Health (NIH), US, World Health Organization (WHO), Bill & Melinda Gates Foundation, and others, particularly through JNMC Women's and Children's Health Research Unit, contributing to pioneering research in maternal and newborn healthcare.

=== Facilitator of international collaborations in education and research ===
Prabhakar Kore has ushered in an era of international collaborations, particularly in health science, healthcare, and medical research. He has facilitated numerous projects and partnerships with esteemed institutions worldwide, including Thomas Jefferson University (TJU) in Philadelphia, University of Illinois in Chicago, University of Michigan, University of Missouri, Sunderland University in the UK, Universiti Sains Malaysia (USM), Copperbelt University in Zambia, Rhodes University in South Africa, Middlesex University in the UK, University of Birmingham in Alabama, Christina Care Health Services in Delaware, Vanderbilt University in Nashville, University of Colorado in Denver, Johns Hopkins Bloomberg School of Public Health, Harvard School of Public Health in Boston, and University of California at San Francisco.

=== Contributions to agriculture and the co-operative movement ===
Prabhakar Kore has made significant contributions across various sectors, including agriculture and cooperative movements. He established the ICAR-KLE Krishi Vigyan Kendra at Mattikopp, Belagavi in 2011, aimed at conducting research and providing education and training to farmers in scientific farming practices. Additionally, he founded the KLE School of Agriculture to encourage scientific farming as a viable career path, particularly among children from agricultural backgrounds. Dr. Kore also played a pivotal role in the cooperative movement, notably with the Chidanand Basaprabhu Kore Co-operative Sugar Factory in Chikodi, Karnataka, which has become a model facility benefiting local farmers. His leadership extended to national platforms as Director of the National Federation of Cooperative Sugar Factories Limited in New Delhi. Moreover, he championed financial support initiatives for farmers through the Dr. Prabhakar Kore Credit Souhard Sahakari Ltd. in Ankali, which has expanded to 46 branches across Karnataka, providing irrigation and housing loans to numerous farmers. Dr. Kore was also instrumental in establishing the Rani Channamma Mahila Sahakari Bank Niyamit in Belagavi, Karnataka, further contributing to cooperative banking in the region.

=== Industrialist and entrepreneur ===
Prabhakar Kore has established Shivashakti Sugars Ltd. at Saundatti in Raibag Taluka of Belagavi District, Karnataka, employing state-of-the-art technology to enhance sugar production and agricultural development in the region. He also served as the Founder Director of Rajkumar Forge Ltd. in Pune, contributing to the industrial sector with his leadership and vision.

=== Accomplishments as an organizer ===
Prabhakar Kore has successfully organized sessions of the Karnataka Legislative Assembly twice at KLE J.N. Medical College campus in Belagavi, first in September 2006 and again in January 2009. He served as the Chairman of the Reception Committee for the prestigious "Vishwa Kannada Sammelana" held in Belagavi in March 2011, inaugurated by industrialist Shri Narayan Murthy of Infosys, along with the Honorable Chief Minister of Karnataka, Shri B.S. Yediyurappa, and renowned film star Aishwarya Rai, attended by dignitaries and Kannadigas from around the world. Dr. Kore also presided as President of the Reception Committee for the 21st Convention of All India Veerashaiva Mahasabha held in Belagavi and chaired the Reception Committee for the 70th Kannada Sahitya Sammelana in 2003. He played a crucial role in establishing the "Suvarna Vidhan Soudha" in Belagavi, the venue for the Karnataka Legislature's Winter Session. Additionally, he was instrumental in the renovation and modernization of Kannada Bhavan in Belagavi, now equipped with theaters for drama and film screenings, promoting Kannada language and culture.

=== Awards and honours ===
Prabhakar Kore has been recognized with numerous accolades and honorary doctorates for his outstanding contributions to education, healthcare, research, and social welfare.

His awards include

- Honorary Doctorate from Karnatak University, Dharwad in February 2008
- Karnataka Government Suvarna Karnataka Rajyotsav Award in 2006
- Lifetime Achievement Award by Veershaiva Samaj of North America in New York in July 2003
- Outstanding Educationist in 2004 by Giants International Group, presented by film personality Sri Amitabh Bachchan.
- "Kannada Vaibhav 2007" by Kannada Sangh Bahrain
- "Eminent Educationist" by Karnatak Sangh Qatar in December 2009
- Felicitation by the Nargis Dutt Foundation in Long Island, New York in 2010
- Lifetime Achievement Award from TIE – The Indus Entrepreneurs in January 2013 at Hubballi.
- Honorary doctorate from Rani Channamma University, Belagavi (2013)
- Honorary doctorate from Universiti Sains Malaysia (2015), making him only the second Indian after Bharat Ratna Dr. APJ Abdul Kalam to receive the latter honor
- Sirigannada Gourav-2016 from Belagavi Zilla Sahitya Pratishthan
- Sri Mrityunjaya Mahant Prashasti in 2017
- Angel Award by the Gift of Life Foundation, New York, US in November 2017
- Basavasri Award by Basava Vedike, Bengaluru in April 2018
- Kayaka Ratna Award in October 2018
- Lifetime Achievement Award at the International Vachana Sahitya Sammelana in Dubai
- Lifetime Achievement Award by the Indo American Press Club, New York, US in May 2022
- Honorary Doctor of Science degree from Thomas Jefferson University, Philadelphia, US, May 2022-the first Indian to receive this honor.

== Electoral History ==
=== Rajya Sabha ===
Position	Party	Constituency	From	To	Tenure
Member of Parliament, Rajya Sabha (1st Term)	INC	Karnataka	10 April 1990	9 April 1996	5 years, 365 days
Member of Parliament, Rajya Sabha (2nd Term)	BJP	Karnataka	26 June 2008	25 June 2014	5 years, 364 days
Member of Parliament, Rajya Sabha (3rd Term)	BJP	Karnataka	26 June 2014	25 June 2020	5 years, 365 days
