= D. V. Guruprasad =

Indian police officer

D.V. Guruprasad, born in Bangalore in 1951 took his Bachelor of Science Degree from National College, Bangalore and later did his Master's in English literature from Karnatak University, Dharwad. He joined the Indian Police Service (IPS) in 1976 and was allotted Karnataka cadre. He served as Superintendent of Police of Bidar, Gulbarga & Kodagu districts, DIG of Gulbarga Range, and Commissioner of Police, Hubli-Dharwad. He headed the State Intelligence Department and the State Information Department. He headed the recruitment wing in the State Police and was responsible for initiating a very transparent recruitment process, which brought him many laurels. He also had his stint in CISF, New Delhi. He served for five years in the Karnataka Road Transport Corporation and was instrumental in dividing the huge entity into four independent entities. He has had a small stint of police training in the U.K. He worked as Director General of Karnataka Criminal Investigation Department and retired as DGP Home Guards, Fire Force & Civil Defense in 2011. He has written over 100 books on Indian police system and related topics, travelogues in English and Kannada languages. He is also columnist of Deccan Herald, English daily newspaper.

He is an author of 106 books, both in English and Kannada. (https://www.sapnaonline.com/shop/author/dv-guruprasad) He has received Karnataka Sahitya Academy Award for his travel book MAYANNARA MAYANAGARI.(https://epaper.vijayavani.net/editionname/Bengaluru/VVAANINEW_BEN/page/12/article/VVAANINEW_BEN_20251010_12_12)

He has been training youth for competitive examinations and has coached over 400 students. He has written 6 books exclusively for motivating young persons. Some of them are B.Sc Fail, IPS Pass, How to face UPSC interviews.

== Books written ==
- Common Man's Guide to Police & Criminal Laws, ISBN 9788170493853
- Corridors of Intelligence: Revealing Politics, ISBN 9788170495550
- CASE STUDIES FOR INDIAN POLICE: True situations handled by Indian Police and lessons learnt
- Police: What You Don't Know, ISBN 9788170495321
- Goodhacharyeya Aa Dinagalu (Kannada)
- Dantakatheyada Dantachora : Operation Veerappan Prathykashadarshigalu Kandanthe (Kannada)
- Police Encounter(Kannada)
- Kaige Banda Tuttu (ಕೈಗೆ ಬಂದ ತುತ್ತು)-Autobiography (Kannada) ISBN 9780463396254
- IGP Sahebra Senior P.A. (Kannada) ISBN 9780463035580
