= Agnikumar G. Vedeshwar =

Indian experimental physicist

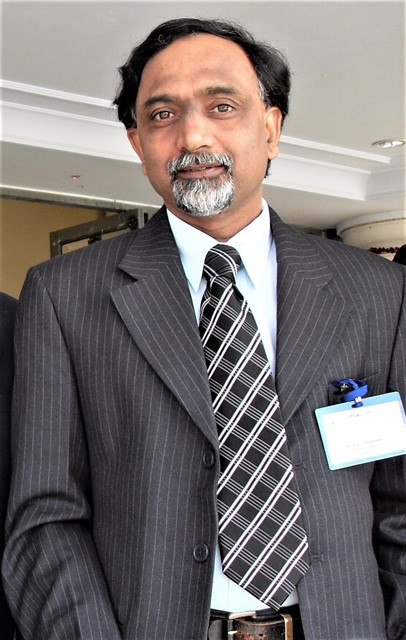
- Agnikumar G Vedeshwar at Delhi University in January 2019
- Born: 29 July 1959 (age 67); Gokarana, Karnataka, India
- Education: Karnatak University
- Known for: Experimental Condensed matter physics, Solid-state physics, Materials physics, Materials science
- Scientific career
- Fields: Experimental Condensed matter physics, Solid-state physics, Materials physics, Materials science
- Workplaces: University of Delhi
- Doctoral advisor: A. M. Karguppikar (Dharwad)

Agnikumar G. Vedeshwar (born July 1959) is an Indian experimental physicist specialized in experimental Condensed matter physics, Solid-state physics, Materials physics, Materials science, Superconductivity and is known for his work in several areas in this field that include: Transport (Hall effect, Thermopower and resistivity) and Optical properties both at low and high temperatures of Semiconductors and High-temperature superconductivity in both bulk and Thin film forms, Thin film fabrication, Vacuum Technology, Photolithography, Electron beam gun, RF Sputtering, device fabrication. He is also known for his work on the analytical techniques: X-ray diffraction, SEM, TEM, ESCA, DTA, EPR and Raman effect in solids, UV/VIS spectroscopy of solids, Thin films for Optical Storage, Surfaces, Interfaces, Nanotechnology, Nanomaterials and Quantum dots, Optical Properties, DFT calculations of Electronic structure, Elastic properties and Optical properties of solids.

== Education and career ==
Vedeshwar obtained his B.Sc. (1981), M.Sc. (1983), Ph.D. (1988) from the Karnatak University. He was a National Superconductivity Fellow at the Department of Physics, IIT Kanpur during 1988–1990, where he was involved in the research and teaching. He was a National Superconductivity Fellow of Department of Science and Technology of India at the Materials Science Division, I.G.C.A.R., Kalpakkam, during 1990–1993. In 1993, he joined the Department of Physics and Astrophysics, University of Delhi as a permanent faculty and worked as a Lecturer during 1993–1998, as a Senior Lecturer during 1998–2002, as a Reader during 2002–2005 and as an Associate Professor during 2006–2009. Eventually, in 2009, he was appointed as a Full Professor of Physics at the Department of Physics and Astrophysics, University of Delhi where he got promoted as a Senior Professor of Physics in December 2019 and he continues to hold that position till date.

== Scientific research ==
Vedeshwar is known for his work in several areas in experimental Condensed matter physics that include: Transport (Hall effect, Thermopower and resistivity) and optical properties both at low and high temperatures of Semiconductors and High-temperature superconductivity in both bulk and Thin film forms, Thin film fabrication, Vacuum Technology, Photolithography, Electron beam gun, RF Sputtering, device fabrication. He is also known for his work on the analytical techniques: X-ray diffraction, SEM, TEM, ESCA, DTA, EPR and Raman effect in solids, UV/VIS spectroscopy of solids, Thin films for Optical Storage, Surfaces, Interfaces, Nanotechnology, Nanomaterials and Quantum dots, optical Properties, DFT calculations of Electronic structure, Elastic properties and optical properties of solids.

Vedeshwar has written over 80 scientific articles, which have received over 1000 citations, many of them are scholar articles that cover several important topics not only in experimental but also in theoretical condensed matter physics and are spread over a long duration of time beginning since his graduate student days till date: His work has made a very significant impact on the studies in several important domains that include e.g., a study of thin films, effect of energetic argon ion irradiation, optical band gap coherence-mediated squeezing and quantum dots quantum dot like behavior of ultra thin films like PbI_{2} and their optical properties, quantum confinement and residual stress effect, formation of 1D nanowires and 2D nanophases, quantum dot like behavior of ultra thin PbI_{2} films, quantum confinement in amorphous InSb and so on.
