= Anant Krishna Shastry =

Indian historian

A. K. Shastry
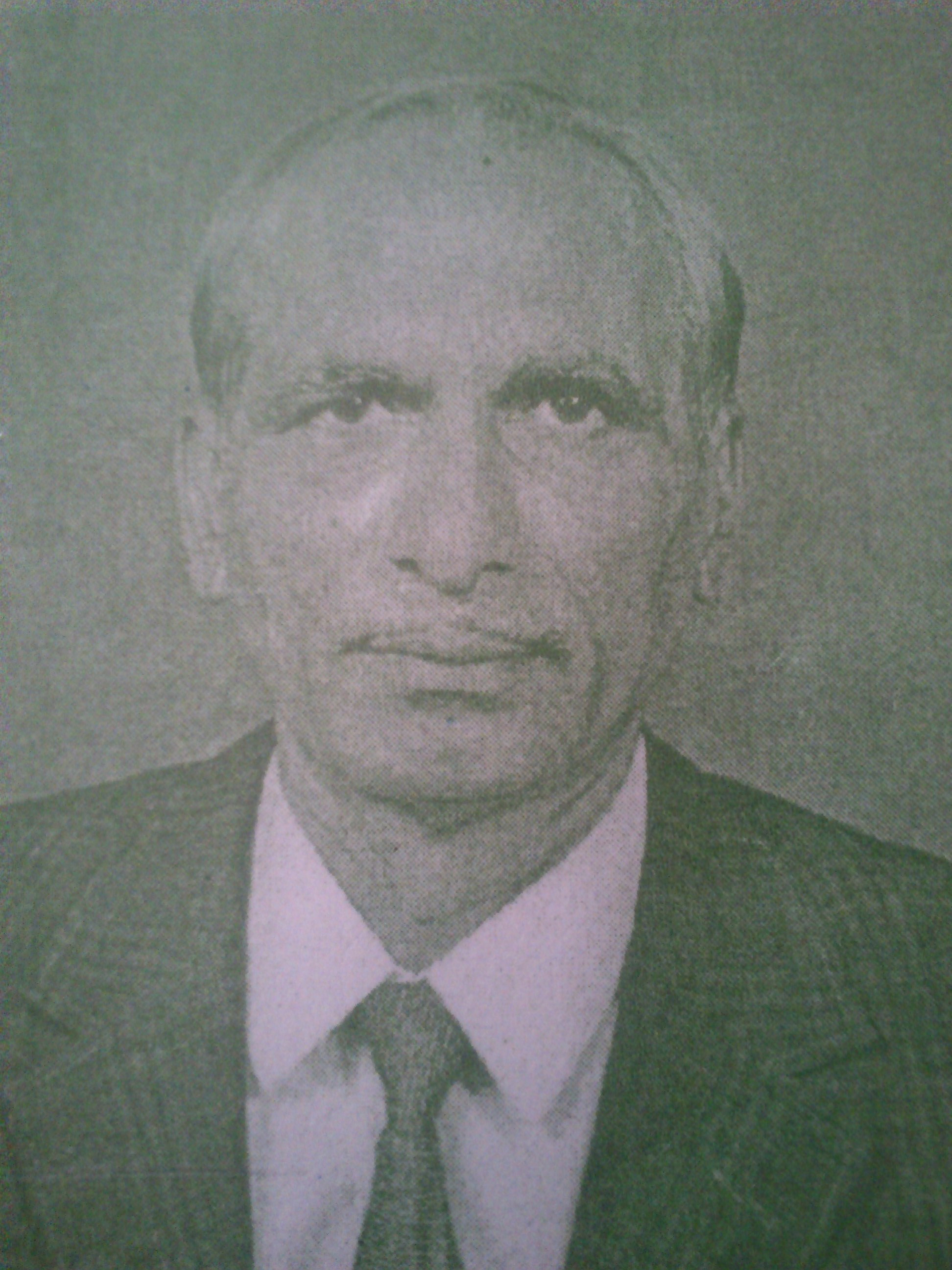
- Born: 17 March 1940; Sirsi, Karnataka
- Died: 4 January 2020 (aged 79); Sirsi, Karnataka
- Occupation: Professor of History
- Known for: Research on Kadatas, books and source material

A. K. Shastry (Anant Krishna Shastry) was an Indian historian in the state of Karnataka, India.

== Life ==
Shastry was the first scholar to extensively study and research manuscripts called Kadata. He also studied more than a hundred thousand palm leaf and paper manuscripts.

Shastry's research focuses on social, political, economic and religious aspects of Sringeri Dharmasamsthana in particular and Karnataka in general, during this time period.

Shastry's major work involves reading, translating/transliterating from "modi kannada" Modi alphabet - an old Kannada script, and generating source material from these manuscripts. He has written several large volumes of source material books that capture these documents verbatim with commentary and analysis. Due to his work on Kadatas, he is known as "Kadata Shastry" in Karnataka's history circles.

He has presided over several state and national level history seminars. He was a professor of history at MES's M. M. College of Arts and Science, Sirsi, affiliated to Karnatak University, Dharwad, from 1964 to 1998.

== Books and research ==
Academic

- A History of Shringeri: Karnatak University, Dharwad. 1st edition 1982, 2nd edition 1999.
- Sringeri Dharmasamsthana (Kannada) : Sringeri Matha, 1983
- Sringeriya Itihasa (Kannada) : Karnatak University, Dharwad. Three editions
- France Deshada Mahakranti (Kannada): Karnatak University, Dharwad
- The records of the Sringeri Matha relating to Keladi: Keladi Museum, 2001
- Selections from the Kadatas of the Sringeri Matha: Unpublished, Indian Council of Historical Research, New Delhi, 1982
- A Catalogue of the Sringeri Records : Karnataka State Archives, Bangalore, 1995/1996
- Kannadadalli Kadatagalu: Kannada Sahatya Parishat, Bangalore, 1997
- Sirsi Talukina Itihasa (Kannada) : M.E Society, Sirsi, 1988
- Sri Sonda Swarnavalli Mahasamsthanada Aitihasika Dakhalegalu (Kannada): Karnataka State Archives, Bangalore, 1997
- Sri Swarnavalli Mahasamsthana (Kannada): Sri Sarwajnendra Sarasvati Pratishthana, Swarnavalli, 1997
- A History of the Swarnavalli Mahasamsthana: Sri Bhagavatpada Prakashana, Swarnavalli, 2004
- Sri Manjuguni Kshetrada Charitrika Dakhalegalu (Kannada): Karnataka State Archives, Bangalore, 1997
- The Historical Records Relating to the Kanara Districts: Unpublished, U.G.C, New Delhi, 2002
- Idagunjiya Sri Mahaganapati Mattu Sabhahitaru (English & Kannada): Lilaganapati Charitable Trust, Haldipur, 2004
- Sringeri Mathada Kadatagalalliya Aayda Charitrika Dakhalegalu (Kannada): Karnataka State Archives, Bangalore, 2003
- Ramrao Divgi - A Karmayogi : Divgi Family, Sirsi, 2005
- Kadambotsava Smarana Sanchike : Editor, 1996
- Sirsi Taluka Darpana : Editor, M.E Society, Sirsi, 1988
- The Karnataka Historical Review : Editor, Dharwad, Vol XXVI
- The Records of the Sringeri Dharmasamsthana : Sringeri Matha, 2009 (U.G.C New Delhi)
- The Records of Sri Chitrapur Matha : 2008
- Banavasi (English): Department of Archeology, Museums and Heritage, Bangalore, 2011
- Banavasi (Kannada): Department of Archeology, Museums and Heritage, Bangalore, 2010

Poems

- Upakhyana (Kannada), Sirsi, 1982
- Anisikegalu (Kannada), Pampa Prakashana, Sirsi, 1993
- Ananta Chutukugalu (Kannada), Sirsi, 2010
- Chuti Chutukugalu (Kannada), Sirsi, Bhavani Prakashana, 2012

== Biographies ==
- In 1998, a felicitation volume called 'Itihasa Samshodhaka', edited by Dr. G. M Hegde, was published
- In 2015, on the occasion of Dr. Shastry's 75th birthday, a felicitation volume called 'Ananta Krishna Charita', edited by Ganapati Bhat, Vargasar, was published
