= C. N. S. Iyengar =

Indian professor of mathematics

C. N. ShrinivasIyengar
- Citizenship: Indian
- Education: Calcutta University
- Scientific career
- Fields: Mathematics
- Workplaces: Karnatak University Dharwad, Central College of Bangalore University

C. N. S. Iyengar (- died 1972) was an Indian professor of mathematics and the founder head of the department of mathematics, Karnatak University, Dharwar. The department was started in the year 1956 under the leadership of Iyengar.

Iyengar received a D.Sc. (c.c) from Calcutta University, Calcutta. After retiring from the Central College of Bangalore University, he joined the Karnataka University, Dharwar in 1956 and retired from there in 1965. He had contributed extensively to the field of differential geometry and Riemannian geometry. Iyengar wrote a book The History of Ancient Indian Mathematics (1967 - World Press)
