= T. K. Tukol =

Judge of Karnataka Highcourt

Justice

Vice Chancellor of Bangalore University

Personal details
- Born: 5 May 1918 Gudur, Hungund Taluka, Bagalkote district, Karnataka
- Died: 18 August 1983 (aged 65) Bangalore
- Citizenship: Indian
- Education: Karnatak College, Dharwar and Fergusson College Pune
- Occupation: Judge, scholar
- Known for: Sallekhana is not suicide

Academic work
- Discipline: Judiciary, Education, Religion (Jainism)

Justice T. K. Tukol (5 May 1918 – 18 August 1983) was known for his scholarly work on Jainism, education and judiciary. He was the judge of High court of Mysore. He headed the Mysore pay commission (1966–68). He also served as the vice-chancellor of the Bangalore University. His contribution to judiciary and books on Jainism (Compendium of Jainism, Sallekhana is not suicide, Jain Achar (Kannada), Yoga, Meditation and Mysticism in Jainism, translation of Saman Suttam (English) and various publications) are remarkable.

Tukol was born in Gudur village of Hungund Taluka, Bagalkote district. He was a student of Karnatak College Dharwar and Fergusson College, Pune.

== See also ==
- Index of Jainism-related articles
