= Ramachandra S. Hosmane =

Indian chemist and professor

- Born: 1944 (age 81–82); Gokarna, India
- Education: University of South Florida; University of Illinois, Urbana-Champaign; Karnatak University
- Scientific career
- Fields: Chemistry
- Workplaces: University of Maryland, Baltimore County

Ramachandra "(Ram)" S. Hosmane (1944-) is a retired Senior Professor of Organic Chemistry at University of Maryland, Baltimore County. Dr. Hosmane has over 160 peer-reviewed research publications in reputed international journals. He holds seven U.S. and World patents, some of which have been licensed to industries. His current research focus is on drug discovery for dual inhibition of HCV and HIV as well as lung, breast, and prostate cancers.

== Early life ==
Ram Hosmane was born in Gokarna, Uttara Kannada, India and completed Bhadrakali High School, Gokarna. In 1966, he earned a B.Sc. in chemistry from Karnataka University, Dharwar, followed by a M.Sc. degree in Organic Chemistry from the same institution in 1968.

== Career ==
Hosmane moved to the United States in the early 1970s to pursue a doctoral degree in organic synthesis and medicinal chemistry at the University of South Florida, where he earned M.S. (1976) and Ph.D. degrees (1978). After completing his postdoctoral training (1979–82) at the University of Illinois, Urbana-Champaign, Hosmane joined UMBC as an assistant professor in 1982 and was promoted to associate professor with academic tenure in 1986. He was promoted to the rank of full professor in 1994.

His research work has been supported by about 50 grants from federal and state agencies such as the National Institutes of Health and the Maryland Industrial Partnerships (MIPS), and private foundations such as the American Heart Association, American Cancer Society, and the Petroleum Research Fund as well as a variety of industrial sources. He has contributed significantly to the development of organic and medicinal chemistry.

He was honored as the University Presidential Research Professor for 1998–2001. In 1996, he was recognized as Outstanding Mentor of Project SEED of the American Chemical Society.

Two major research areas of Hosmane include blood substitutes based on hemoglobins and the discovery of antiviral and anticancer compounds based on ring-expanded nucleoside structures. Th

Hosmane is a managing editor of Current Topics in Medicinal Chemistry and Frontiers in Bioscience, part of the Frontiers Media group, and Regional Editor, Molecules .
