= Jaiprakashreddy Patil =

- Born: 10 March 1954 (age 71); Manvi, Mysore State (present–day Karnataka), India
- Awards: TCS- Education World Best Teacher Merit Award (2005)
- Scientific career
- Institutions: National Law University and Judicial Academy, Assam

Prof. J.S. Patil is a Professor of Law and the former Vice-Chancellor of National Law University and Judicial Academy, Assam. He was the Founder Vice-Chancellor of Karnataka State Law University, Hubli, 2009–12.

== Early life and education ==
Jaiprakashreddy Sannabasanagouda Patil was born in an agriculturist family at Manvi, Raichur district, Karnataka. He qualified in law from Karnataka University, Dharwad in 1977, and pursued LL.M. from the University of Mysore, and earned his master's degree in 1979. He received his PhD from Saurashtra University, Rajkot in 1997.

== Books and publications ==
- Legal Regime of the Seabed, 1981, Deep & Deep Publications, New Delhi
- Gramina Janate Mattu Kanunu, Prasaranga, Gulbarga University, Kalaburagi
- Tulanatmaka Kanunu, 1995, Vidyanidhi Prakashana, Gadag
- Mahile Mattu Kanunu, 1996, Prasaranga Gulbarga University, Kalaburagi
- Nyaya Shastra Adhyayana, 1996 Ramashraya publications, Dharwad
- Bhrata Sakshya Adhiniyama, 1996 Ramashraya Publications, Dharwad
- Karnataka Bhu-Sudharane Adhiniyama, 1996, Ramashraya Publications, Dharwad
- Karnataka Diwani Vyavaharanegala Niyamagalu, 1997, Ramashraya Publications, Dharwad
- "Sri Gangadhar Namoshi", a book published by the Government of Karnataka
- Spirit of Human Rights, A Manual, 2005, published by National Human Rights Commission, New Delhi
- Intellectual Property Rights, A Manual, 2005, published by Siddhartha Law College, Kalaburagi
