= D. M. Nanjundappa =

Indian economist

- Born: Dogganal Mahadevappa Nanjundappa; 25 October 1929; Dogganal village, Ramgiri hobli, Holalkere taluk, Chitradurga district, Karnataka
- Died: 26 September 2005 (aged 75); Bengaluru

Dr. Dogganal Mahadevappa Nanjundappa (died 2005) was an Indian economist from Karnataka and a professor of economics at Karnataka University, Dharwad. He served as the Vice-chancellor of the Bangalore University from 1987 and the Karnataka University. Professor Nanjundappa was deputy chair of the Karnataka State Planning Board. He was well known for his "Report of the High Power Committee for Redressal of Regional Imbalances in Karnataka" He died on Monday, 26 September 2005 at Bangalore and was buried with State honours at his native place Dogganal, in Holalkere Taluk of Chitradurga District.
