= Karnatak University =

State University in Karnataka, India

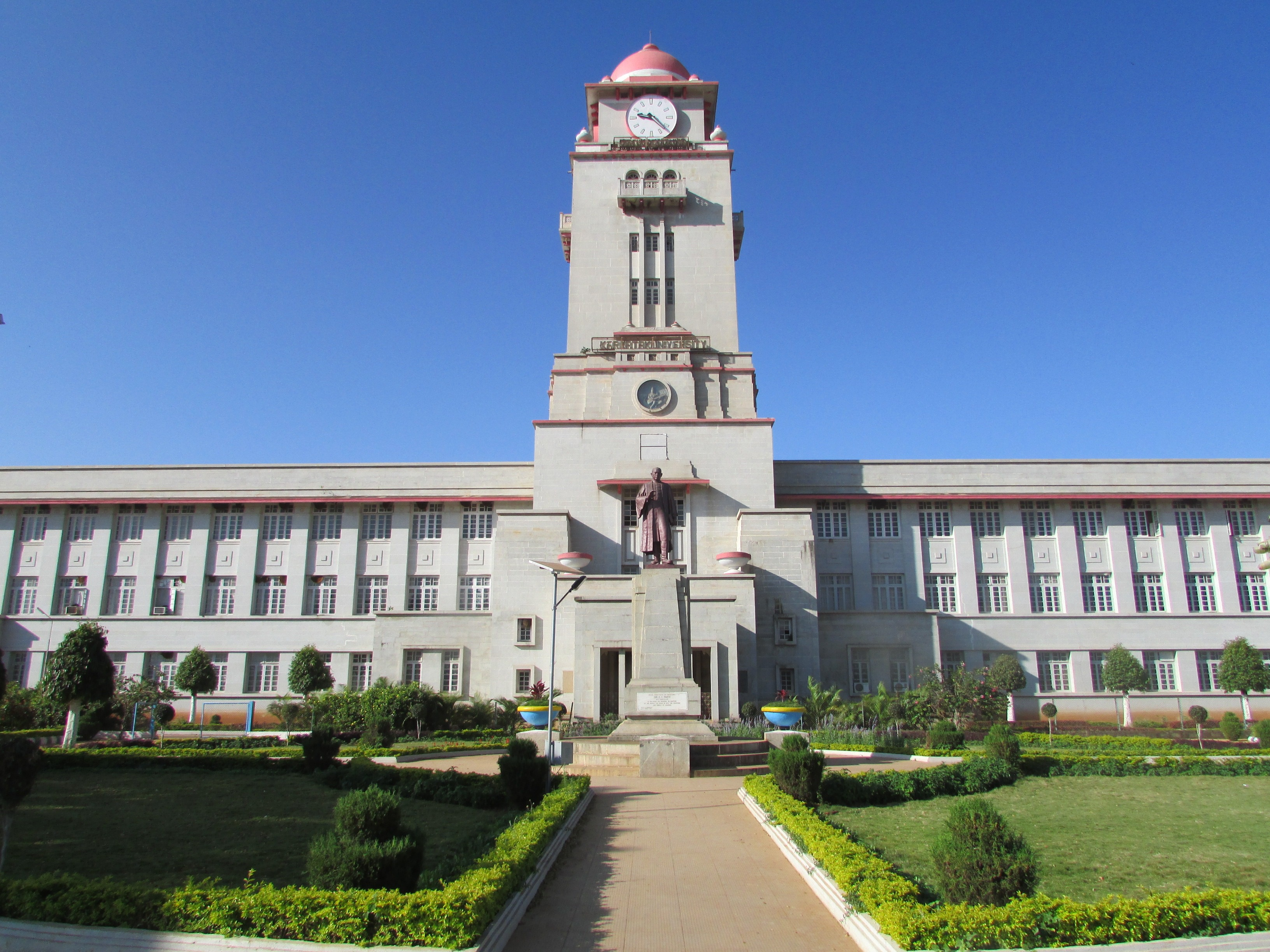
- Vidya Soudha, Karnatak University
- Motto: ಅರಿವೇ ಗುರು (Wisdom is guru)
- Type: Public state university
- Established: 1950; 76 years ago
- Founder: Government of Karnataka
- Affiliations: UGC; NAAC; AIU; ACU
- Chancellor: Governor of Karnataka
- Vice-Chancellor: Airani Mohammad Khan
- Location: Dharwad, Karnataka, India; 15°26′28.5″N 74°59′2.1″E
- Campus: Urban
- Website: www.kud.ac.in

Karnatak University (KUD) is a public state university in Dharwad, Karnataka, India. KUD was officially established in 1950 through the Karnatak University Act, 1949, passed by the legislature of the Bombay Province.

The university is the second-oldest in the state of Karnataka, after the University of Mysore. Karnatak University once served most parts of Karnataka, including the districts of Dharwad, Belagavi, Uttara Kannada, Vijayapura, Kalaburagi, Raichur, Bidar and Ballari until the 1980s. Additionally, from 1953 to 1965, the Manipal Institute of Technology and Kasturba Medical College in Manipal were affiliated with Karnatak University. The bifurcation of districts and the establishment of new universities in the region have reduced Karnatak University's jurisdiction to the present-day districts of Dharwad, Gadag, Uttara Kannada.

The university is recognized under "University with Potential for Excellence" scheme by the University Grants Commission. In 2022, the National Assessment and Accreditation Council (NAAC) accredited KUD with an 'A' grade and a CGPA of 3.13.

== History ==
As early as 1917, the people of North Karnataka raised donations for establishing a university in the region and handed them to the government of Bombay Presidency, in the same year, the presidency government passed a resolution to establish universities in different linguistic regions of the presidency. Later a committee under the chairmanship of Chimanlal Harilal Setalvad recommended the establishment of Karnatak University and the senate of Bombay University gave its assent in 1926. During the 12th session of Kannada Sahitya Sammelana at Ballari, the first Karnatak University conference was held with members resolved to form an organisation called ''Karnatak Vishwavidyala Samithi" with Aluru Venkata Rao and S. S. Basavanal as its secretaries. After a period of dormancy, the second Karnatak University conference was held at Belgaum with R. A. Jahagirdar as its president. In 1946, Karnataka Vidyavardhaka Sangha observed "Karnatak University Day" all over the region. Subsequently, the Bombay government appointed the Karnatak University committee and in 1949 the "Karnatak University" bill was passed in the legislature paving the way for establishment of KUD with R. A. Jahagirdar as its first vice chancellor.

== Academics ==
KUD comprises 51 postgraduate departments, 154 teaching staff and a student strength of 4,500.

== Affiliated colleges ==
KUD has more than 250 colleges affiliated to it throughout its jurisdiction. KUD administers 5 constituent colleges throughout Dharwad namely Karnatak Arts College, Karnatak Science College, University College of Education, Sir. Siddappa Kambli Law College and University College of Music & Fine Arts.

== Campus ==
KUD's campus spans 888 acres in the Pavate Nagar area of Dharwad. The main building of KUD, the Vidya Soudha was built in 1959 with emphasis on embibing Indian architecture with Neoclassical style.

== Postgraduation centers ==
KUD has 3 PG centers other than the main campus, namely at Karwar, Gadag and Haveri.

- PG Center, Karwar: Established in 1975, with academic programs focusing on Marine Sciences in addition with Commerce and English studies.
- PG Center, Gadag: Established in 2000, offering academic programs like MCom, MBA and MSW.
- PG Center, Haveri: Established in 2001, with academic programs in the fields of Kannada studies, Social work, Commerce, English studies, Sociology, Journalism & Mass communication.

== Postgraduate departments ==
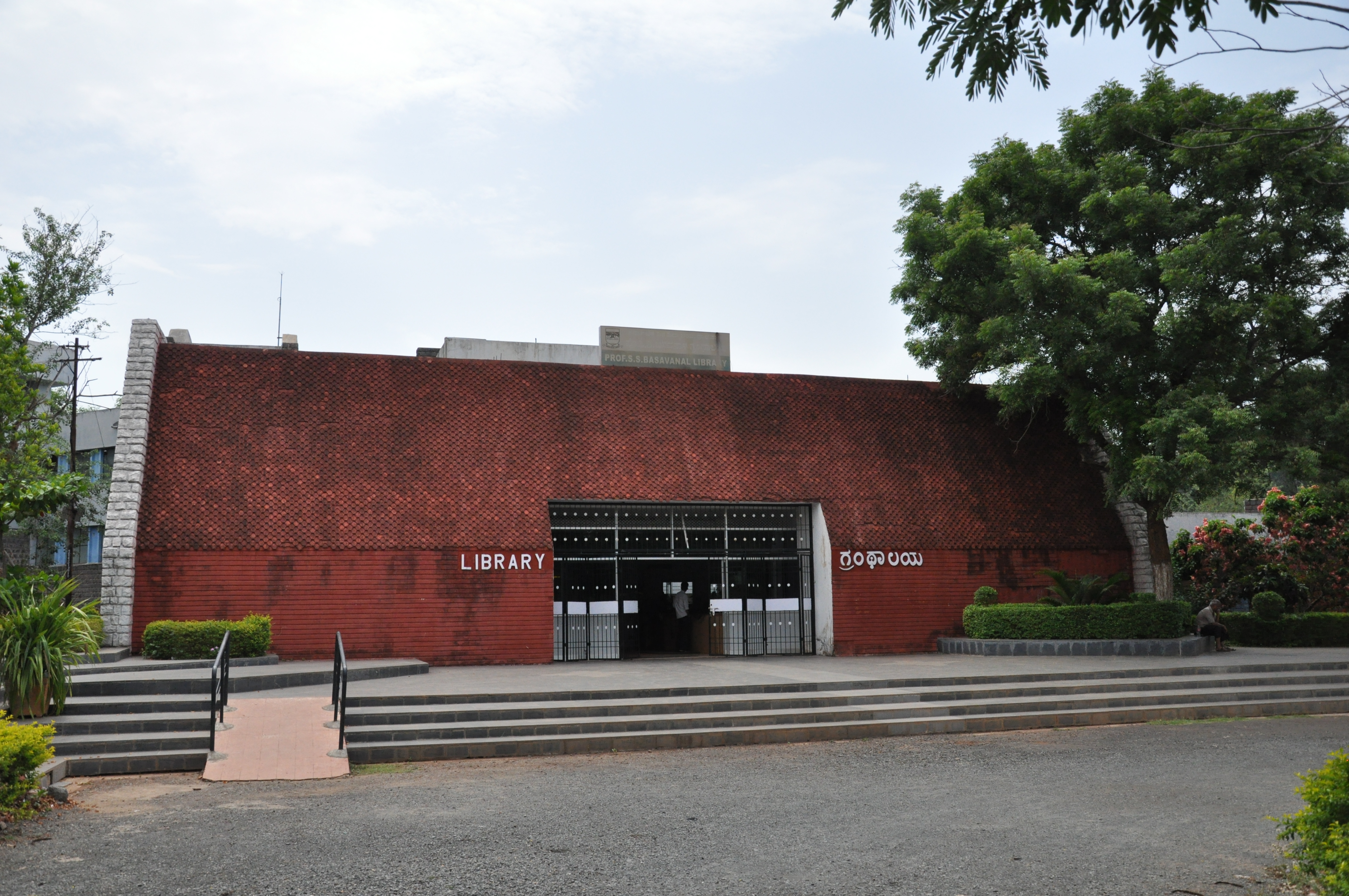
University Main Library

The university currently has the following faculties: Arts, Science and Technology, Social science, Commerce, Law, Education, Management.

=== Science departments ===
- Department of Computer Science
- Department of Electronics
- Department of Physics
- Department of Mathematics
- Department of Statistics
- Department of Library Science
- Department of Applied Genetics
- Department of Microbiology & Biotechnology
- Department of Chemistry
- Department of Botany
- Department of Geology
- Department of Sericulture
- Department of Zoology
- Department of Marine Biology
- Department of Oceanography
- Center for Excellence in Polymer Science
- Research Center For DNA Diagnostics

=== Social Science Departments ===
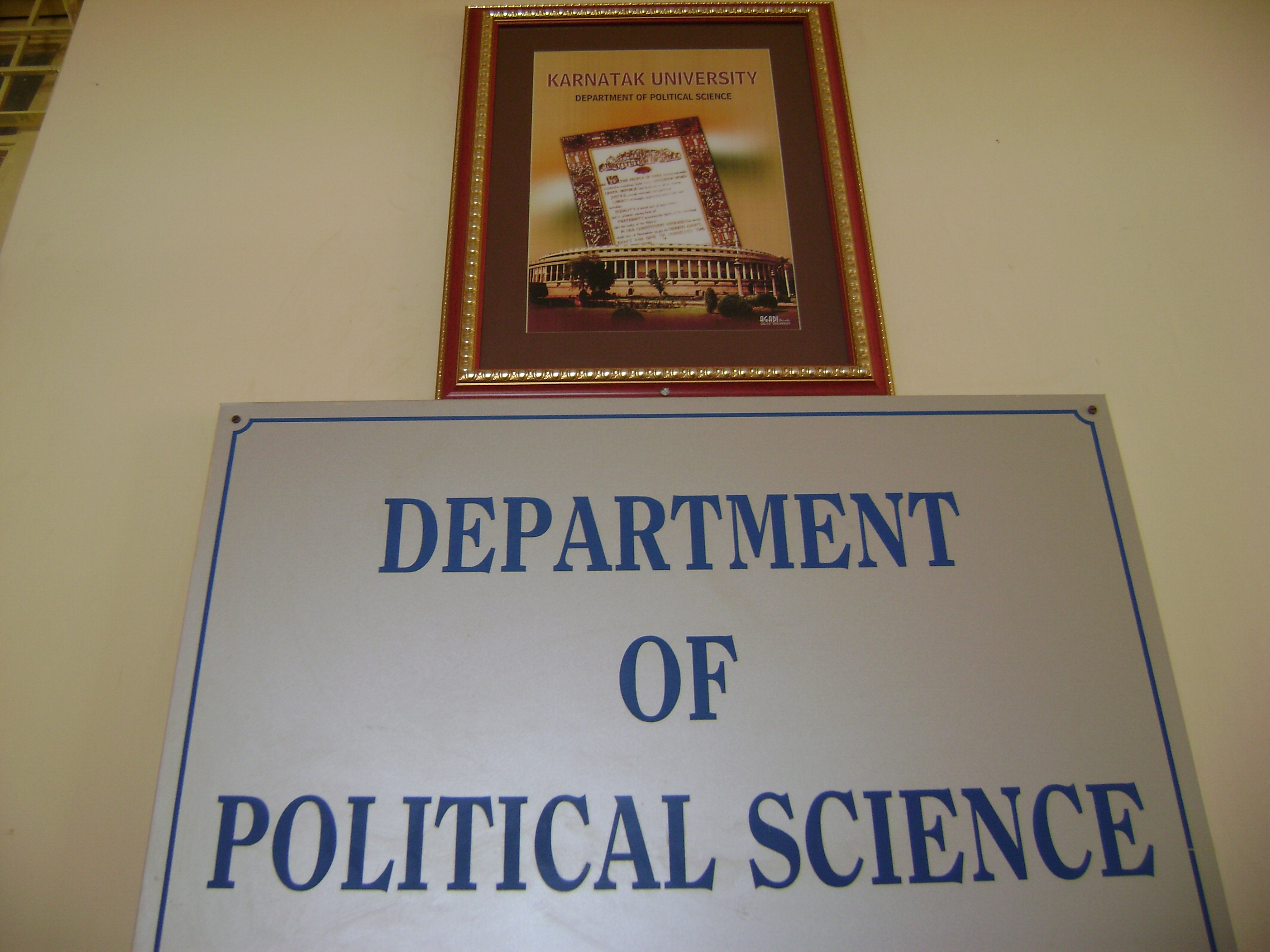
Political Science Department

- Department of Sociology
- Department of Economics
- Department of Political Science
- Department of Commerce
- Department of Gandhian Studies
- Department of A.I. History & Epigraphy
- Department of Law
- Department of Education
- Department of Anthropology
- Department of Geography
- Department of Yoga Studies
- Department of Criminology & Forensic Science
- Department of Journalism & Mass Communication
- Department of Philosophy
- Department of Psychology
- Department of Population Sciences
- Department of Social Work
- Research Center for Women's Studies
- Department of Library and Information Science
- Department of Urban Design & Planning

=== Department of Management Studies ===
- Master in Business Administration,
- Master in Commerce,
- Master in Corporate Secretaryship

=== Art Departments ===
- Dr. R. C. Hiremath Institute of Kannada Studies
- Department of Cultural Studies
- Department of Folklore
- Department of English
- Department of Sanskrit
- Department of Foreign Languages
- Department of Hindi
- Department of Yoga Studies
- Department of Music
- Department of Kannada Research Institute

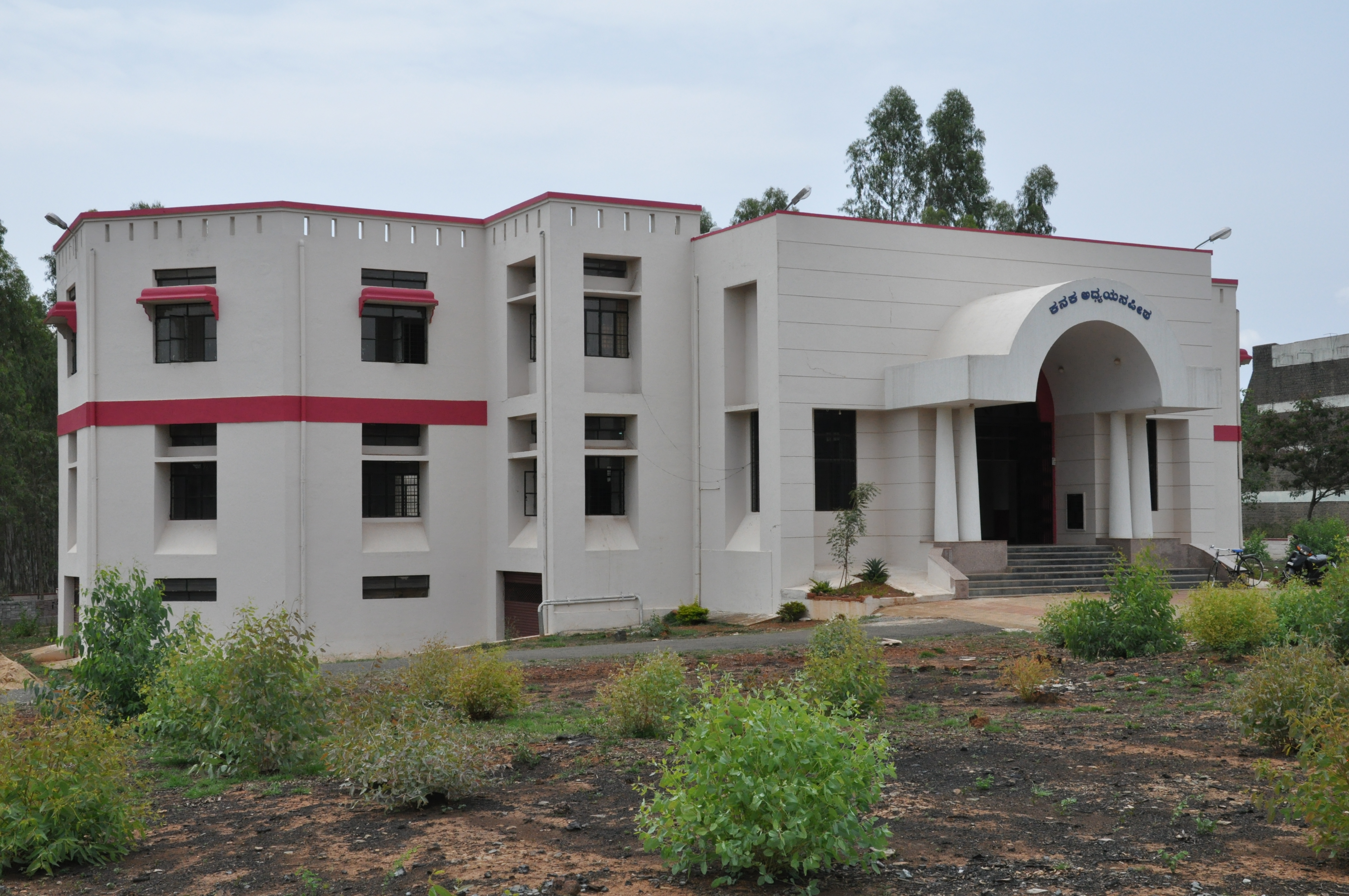
Kanaka Adhyayana Peeta at Karnatak University

== List of vice-chancellors ==
From	To	Name
1 April 1949	17 July 1951	R. A. Jagirdhar
18 July 1951	17 July 1954	C. C. Hulkuti
1954	1967	Dr. D. C. Pavate
17 December 1967	16 December 1973	Dr. A. S. Adake
21 February 1974	18 January 1975	Jayalakshammani
1 May 1975	30 April 1978	Dr. R. C. Hiremath
15 May 1978	14 May 1981	Sadashiva Wodeyar
20 May 1981	20 June 1984	Dr. D. M. Nanjundappa
20 June 1984	30 June 1987	Dr. Sangappa G. Desai
1 July 1987	30 June 1990	Dr. G. K. Narayan Reddy
2 July 1990	1 July 1996	Dr. S. Rame Gowda
2 July 1996	1 July 2002	Dr. A. M. Pathan
1 July 2002	1 July 2006	Dr. M. Kajapeer
2 July 2005	24 October 2006	A. Murigappa (acting)
25 October 2006	24 October 2010	Dr. S. K. Saidapur
25 October 2010	20 October 2014	Dr. H. B. Walikar
16 June 2015	15 June 2019	Dr. Pramod B. Gai
26 September 2020	25 September 2024	Dr. K. B. Gudasi
26 September 2024	25 February 2025	B. M. Patil (acting)
26 February 2025	4 July 2025	R. L. Hyderabad (acting)
5 July 2025	Incumbent	A. M. Khan

== Notable alumni ==
- J. Alexander
- Joseph Almeida (educator)
- G. S. Amur
- K. S. Amur
- S. Rajendra Babu
- Shobhan Bantwal
- U. Narayan Bhat
- P. T. Bopanna
- Joseph D'souza
- Sucheta Dalal
- Vasant P. Dandin
- D. V. Guruprasad
- Suresh Heblikar
- Jyoti Hegde
- Panduranga Hegde
- S. R. Hiremath
- Narayan Sadashiv Hosmane
- Ramachandra S. Hosmane
- Ramakrishna V. Hosur
- Pankaj Jain
- A. M. Jayannavar
- Jayanth Kaikini
- Shashikala Kakodkar
- Chandrashekhara Kambara
- Girish Karnad
- Mallikarjun Kharge
- Vivek Kulkarni
- Ananth Kumar
- Bhaskar Maiya
- Sudha Murty
- Ramdas Pai
- T. M. A. Pai
- V. R. Panchamukhi
- Y. G. Parameshwara
- Jaiprakashreddy Patil
- Pius Fidelis Pinto
- Vasant K. Prabhu
- A. R. D. Prasad
- K. V. Ramesh
- Anil Sahasrabudhe
- Srinivas Kishanrao Saidapur
- V. C. Sajjanar
- Suresh Raj Sharma
- Anant Krishna Shastry
- Srikanth
- Siddeshwar Swami
- Agnikumar G. Vedeshwar
