= A. R. D. Prasad =

Indian information professional and Information scientist

Dr. A.R.D. Prasad
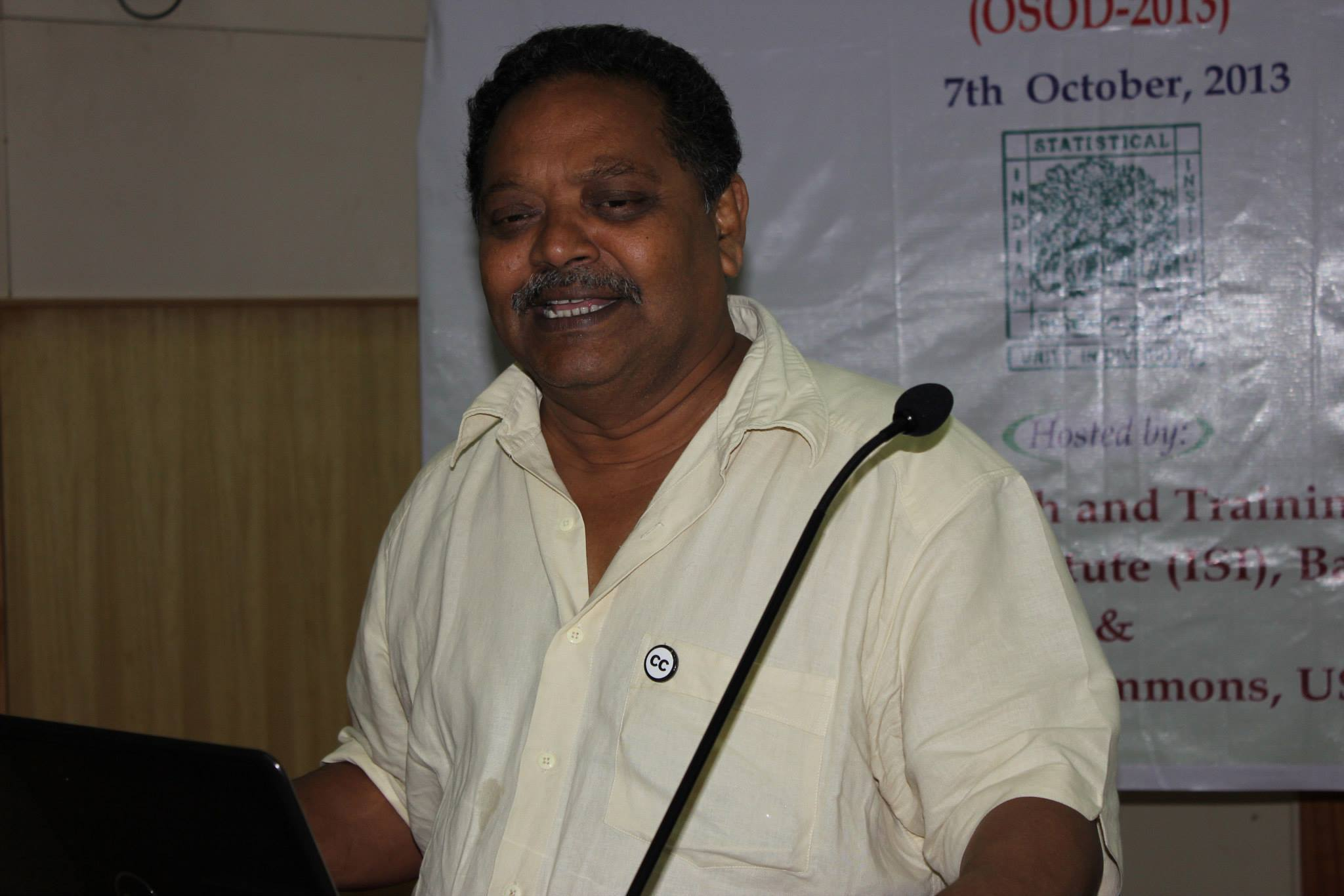
- Prof. ARD Prasad at OSOD Workshop
- Born: 18 July 1954 (age 72)
- Education: Indian Statistical Institute (DRTC), Karnataka University
- Occupation: Professor

Dr A.R.D. Prasad is an Indian Library and Information Science Academic, Information professional and Information scientist. Dr Prasad was a Professor at Documentation Research and Training Centre (DRTC), Bangalore as Professor of Library and Information Science and he is retired Head of DRTC, which is India's only proper ischool with a very strong research program. His areas of specialisation include Artificial intelligence-Applications in LIS, Natural language processing, Digital Libraries, Hypertext and Multimedia applications, Institutional repository, Open-source software used in Libraries, Open Access to Information, Semantic Web Technology, Free and open source software etc. His other area of interests are Mythology, Buddhism, Philosophy and Indian History. He is pioneer in the promotion and development of Open-source software used in Libraries and Information Centres in India, Open access (publishing) and Open Access movement. He is visiting Faculty of University of Trento, Italy.

== Early life ==
He has Master of Arts (M.A), M.Phil. in Philosophy, BLIS, ADIS (from DRTC, ISI) and obtained his doctorate (PhD) on "Application of Natural Language Processing Tools and Technique in Developing Subject Indexing Languages" from Karnatak University, Dharwad.

== Memberships and association ==
- Member, Working Group, National Knowledge Commission, Government of India.
- Member, DSpace Governance Advisory Committee
- Member, Project Evaluation committee on E-Infrastructure, European Commission, Brussels.
- Member, UGC Curriculum Development Committee
- Member, UGC ETDs Guidelines (Electronic Theses and Dissertations)
- Member, Retro-conversion committee of National Library of India
- Consultant, United Nations-Food and Agriculture Organization (UN-FAO)
- A Fulbright Scholar(1999)
- Mentor, Google Summer of Code
- Invited Speaker, Indian National Science Congress, 2006, Hyderabad

== Literary and scientific activities ==
He has been actively involved in the development and promotion of digital library systems and has contributed to the establishment of digital repositories across several Indian institutions, including Indian Institutes of Technology (IITs), National Institutes of Technology (NITs), Council of Scientific and Industrial Research (CSIR), Defence Research and Development Organisation (DRDO), and universities.

== Contributions to digital libraries ==
Prasad has made significant contributions to the field of digital libraries and knowledge organization:

- Developed digital repositories for endangered tribal languages of Tamil Nadu (https://tholkudi.in) and for the Central Institute of Indian Languages (https://sanchika.ciil.org/info/contributors .
- Presented advanced metadata frameworks at international conferences, including the Gyan Bharatam Conference.
- Served on the DSpace Governance Advisory Board at the Massachusetts Institute of Technology (MIT), USA.
- Developed and distributed an Ubuntu-based LiveDVD preconfigured with DSpace and Koha, which recorded over 30,000 downloads globally. (https://sourceforge.net/projects/dspace-livedvdkrishna/)
- Conducted more than 50 training workshops across India and internationally, including in Sri Lanka, Thailand, Tunisia, Samoa, Maldives, Mauritius and Malaysia, .

Research and Projects

Prasad has participated in and led several national and international research initiatives:

- Living Knowledge Project (European Commission): Focused on semantic web technologies (http://livingknowledge-project.eu/) .
- AgInfra Project (European Commission): Focused on agricultural data infrastructure. (https://aginfra.eu/ )
- India–Trento Programme for Advanced Research: Led research on ontology development.
- Integrated AGRIS-AP metadata schema into DSpace in collaboration with the Food and Agriculture Organization (FAO).
- Developed an NGO portal for the UNAIDS programme in India for the World Health Organization

.
