= P. T. Bopanna =

Author and journalist from India

Palanganda Thimmaiah Bopanna
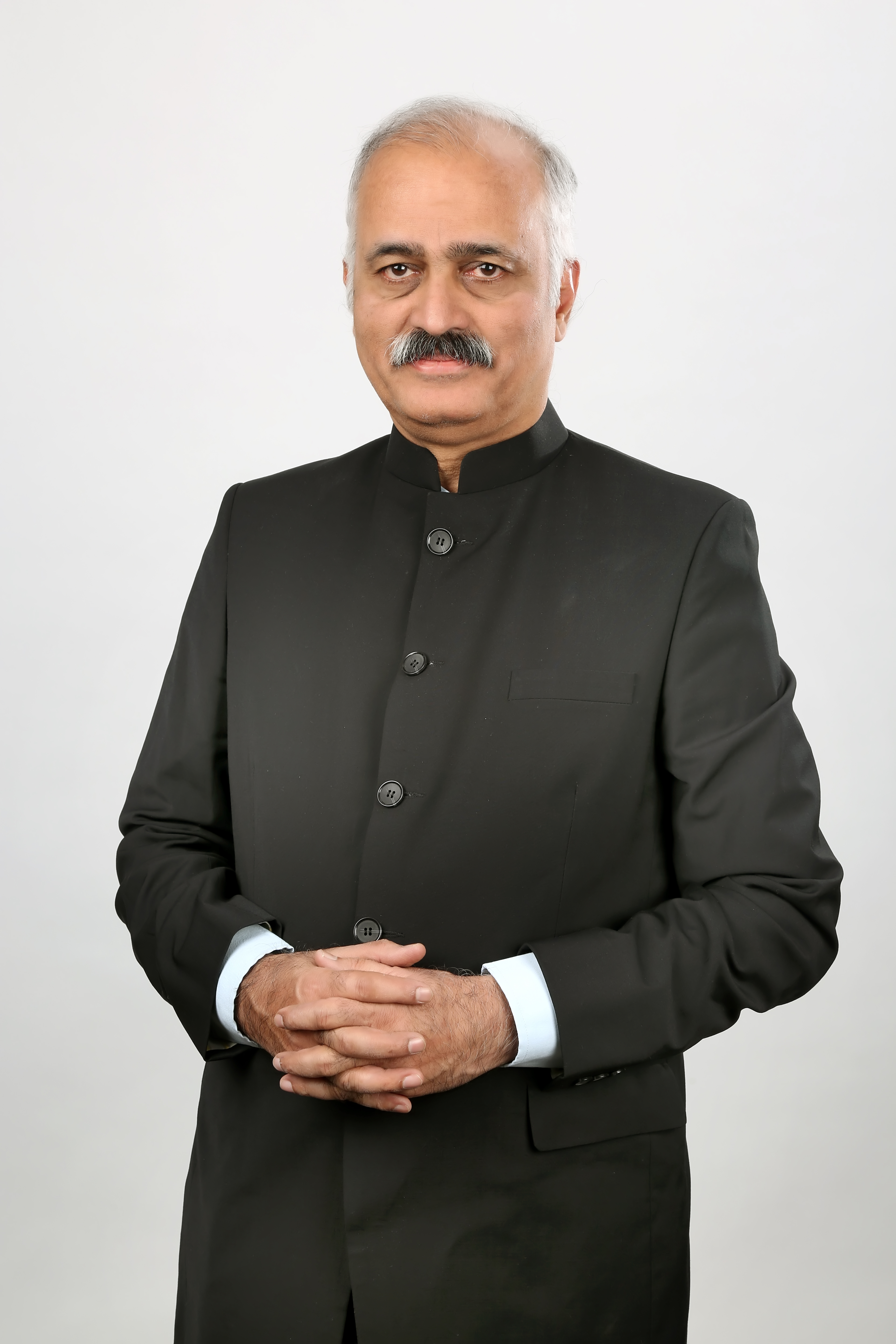
- Born: 30 June 1950 (age 76); India
- Occupation: Author
- Writing career
- Notable work: Discover Coorg (2006, Prism Books)
- Website: www.coorgtourisminfo.com

Palanganda T. Bopanna (born 30 June 1950) is an author and journalist from Kodagu (Coorg) in Karnataka, India. Bopanna has worked for some of the leading Indian English dailies, including The Times of India, Bangalore, for 12 years (Principal Correspondent), and The Pioneer (New Delhi), as their Special Correspondent (Bangalore) for 13 years. He has written five books.

== Early life ==
Bopanna obtained his B.A. degree (Economics) from Madras University (Chennai) and M.A. in political science from Karnatak University, Dharwad. He also has a post-graduate diploma in journalism from Bhavans, Mumbai.

== Career ==
Bopanna began his journalistic career in 1981 as the Coorg Correspondent of The Hindu newspaper. He worked for 12 years with The Times of India, Bangalore (June 1984), starting as Reporter and exiting as Principal Correspondent. Subsequently, he worked for 13 years as Special Correspondent with The Pioneer at Bangalore from August 1996. He covered mostly political news for the paper. For six years he served as Bangalore Stringer (from 1998) of the Associated Press, an American news agency. He covered general news with emphasis on human interest stories. He taught journalism for six years to undergraduate and post-graduate students from 2001 to 2006. For two years, he taught at Surana College, Bangalore, two years at Jain College, Bangalore, and two years at Sri Sri Institute of Media Studies, Bangalore. He won two awards in 1986 instituted by the Bangalore Reporters' Guild for best crime story and scoop of the year. Presently he is the person who decides the 'Coorg person of the year'.

== Books ==
Bopanna has written six books : Discover Coorg (2006, Prism Books), The Rise and Fall of the Coorg State (2009), Dateline Coorg (2010), Coorg: Land of Beauty and Valour (2010, Prism Books) and The Romance of Indian Coffee (2011, Prism Books). The book Discover Coorg, published by Prism Books Ltd., Bangalore, was translated into the Kannada language – Kodagu: Mungaru Maleya Vismayada (2008). Another book Rise and Fall of the Coorg State has been translated into both the Kannada and the Kodava languages. Bopanna has also released a book titled 'Are Kodavas (Coorgs) Hindus?' (2018), which debates the religion of the Kodavas.

== Websites ==
Bopanna launched www.coorgtourisminfo.com, a news and tourism portal in 2005. In 2014 he launched a news portal which covers news exclusively from Kodagu, called Coorg news.

== DVD on Coorg ==
In April 2015, Bopanna released a 35-minute DVD on Coorg called Discover Coorg Video. It featured the tourist spots, homestays, jewellery, and golf ranges in Coorg, the Kodava family hockey festival and Kodava culture, including the traditional folk dances and weddings. It was supported by the Pemanda Monappa Foundation.

== Online Campaign ==
Through his news portal www.coorgtourisminfo.com, P.T. Bopanna started an online campaign to improve the condition of the neglected Hunsur–Gonikoppal Road, a 45-km highway between the districts of Mysuru and Kodagu. IAS officer P Manivannan, Chief Project Officer at Karnataka State Highways Improvement Project, took notice of the issue and convinced PWD Minister Dr H C Mahadevappa to start the work. But work came to a standstill because the contractors were not paid. In November 2012, Bopanna met Governor Hansraj Bhardwaj and submitted a memorandum for resuming the work. Upon the governor's direction, the work recommenced but it came to a standstill once again, because of the monsoon rains and because construction materials were not available. Finally, two stretches of the road were completed in late 2014.

== Gourmand Award ==
In December 2015 P T Bopanna's book 2011 The Romance of Indian Coffee was selected for the International Gourmand World Cookbook Awards given under the category of 'Best Coffee Books' from India. The Gourmand World Cookbook Awards were founded in 1995 by Edouard Cointreau. Later, at the Gourmand World Awards ceremony held at Yantai in China, 'The Romance of Indian Coffee' was chosen as the best book on coffee in the world.

== Personal life ==
Bopanna is the son of P. M. Thimmaiah and Kamy Thimmaiah. He is married to Sita Bopanna.

Bopanna's son Devaiah Bopanna, also a writer, is a Creative Writer with All India Bakchod.
