= Current Topics in Medicinal Chemistry =

- Discipline: Medicinal chemistry
- Language: English
- Edited by: Jia Zhou

Publication details
- History: 2001–present
- Publisher: Bentham Science Publishers
- Frequency: Biweekly
- Impact factor: 3.570 (2021)

Standard abbreviations
- ISO 4: Curr. Top. Med. Chem.

Indexing
- CODEN: CTMCCL
- ISSN: 1568-0266 (print); 1873-4294 (web)
- OCLC no.: 47218405

Links
- Journal homepage; Online access; Online archive

Current Topics in Medicinal Chemistry is a biweekly peer-reviewed medical journal published by Bentham Science Publishers. It includes review articles on all aspects of medicinal chemistry, including drug design. The current editor-in-chief is Jia Zhou (University of Texas, Medical Branch).

== Abstracting and indexing ==
The journal is abstracted and indexed in:

- Biochemistry & Biophysics Citation Index
- BIOSIS Previews
- Chemical Abstracts Service/CASSI
- Current Contents
- Embase/Excerpta Medica
- EMBiology
- Index Medicus/MEDLINE/PubMed
- Science Citation Index Expanded
- Scopus

According to the Journal Citation Reports, the journal has a 2021 impact factor of 3.570.
