= U. Narayan Bhat =

Indian mathematician (1934–2021)

U. Narayan Bhat (1934 – 13 March 2021) was an Indian-born mathematician, known for his contributions to queueing theory and reliability theory.

== Academic career ==
Bhat received a B.A. in mathematics (1953) and B.T. in education (1954) from the University of Madras, an M.A. in statistics (1958) from Karnatak University in Dharwar and PhD in mathematical statistics from the University of Western Australia on the dissertation Some Simple and Bulk Queueing Systems: A Study of Their Transient Behavior (1965). He worked at Michigan State University (1965–66), Case Western Reserve University (1966–69), and Southern Methodist University (1969–2005). Bhat is a fellow of the American Statistical Association and the Institute for Operations Research and the Management Sciences and an elected member of the International Statistical Institute. Bhat was a dean of research and graduate studies at Southern Methodist University and then was named interim dean for the university's Dedman College.

== Death ==
Bhat died on 13 March 2021.

== Books ==
- A Study of the Queueing Systems M/G/1 and GI/M/1, (Springer Verlag, 1968)
- Elements of Applied Stochastic Processes (Wiley, 1972)
- Introduction to Operations Research Models (W. B. Saunders & Co., 1977). With L. Cooper and L. J. LeBlanc
- Queueing and Related Models (Oxford University Press, 1992). Editor with I. V. Basawa
- Elements of Applied Stochastic Processes (Wiley, 2002). With Gregory K. Miller
- Introduction to queueing theory (Birkhauser, 2008)

== Publications ==
- Further Results for the Queue with Poisson Arrivals, Operations Research, Vol. 11(3), (1963), 380–386 (with Narahari Umanath Prabhu).
- Imbedded Markov Chain Analysis of Single-Server Bulk Queues, Journal of the Australian Math, Soc., Vol. 4(2), (1964), 244–263.
- On Single-Server Bulk Queueing Processes with Binomial Input, Operations Research, Vol. 12(4), (1964), 527–533.
- On a Stochastic Process Occurring in Queueing Systems, Journal of Applied Probability, Vol. 2(2), (1965), 467–469.
- Statistical Analysis of Queueing Systems in Frontiers in Queuing by Dshalalow etc. (1997). (with G.K. Miller and S. Subba Rao).
- Estimation of Renewal Processes with Unobservable Gamma or Erlang Interarrival Times, J. Stat. Plan. and Inf., 61 (1997), 355–372 (with G. K. Miller).
- Maximum Likelihood Estimation for Single Server Queues from Waiting Time Data, Queueing Systems (journal), 24, (1997), 155–167 (with I. V. Basawa and R. Lund).
- Estimation of the Coefficient of Variation for Unobservable Service Times in the M/G/1 Queue, Journal of Mathematical Sciences, Vol. 1, 2002 (with G. K. Miller).

== Sources ==
- On Google scholar
