= Anil Sahasrabudhe =

Indian educator

- डॉ. अनिल सहस्रबुद्धे
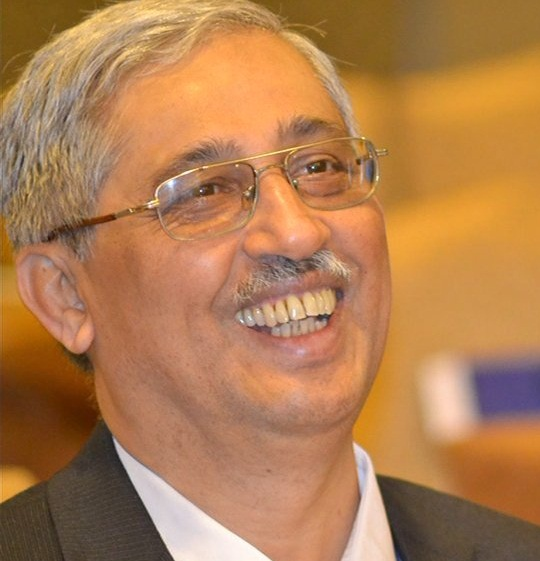
- A portrait of Dr. Anil Sahasrabudhe when he was Director, College of Engineering, Pune (COEP)
- Born: India
- Citizenship: Indian
- Education: (PhD) IISc Bangalore
- Occupations: Chairman NETF, also Chairman EC-NAAC and NBA
- Years active: September 2022 - present
- Organization: National Educational Technology Forum
- Known for: Director, College of Engineering, Pune Chairman, AICTE
- Board member of: College of Engineering, Pune birth_date = 1957

Anil Sahasrabudhe (born 1957) is the present Chairman of National Educational Technology Forum (NETF), chairman of EC National Assessment and Accreditation Council (NAAC) and Chairman NBA.

== Career ==
Sahasrabudhe graduated from BVB College of Engineering and Technology, Hubli, under Karnataka University with a bachelor's degree in mechanical engineering and was a gold medalist. Thereafter, he obtained a master's degree and doctorate from Indian Institute of Science, Bangalore.

Prior to joining College of Engineering, Pune (CoEP), as Director on deputation Sahasrabudhe was a member of faculty at IIT Guwahati since its inception in 1995 and held several responsibilities including Head of the department, chairman, Library Committee, Chairman JEE, Dean Academic Affairs, and deputy director. Prior to that, he was also a lecturer and assistant professor at NERIST, Itanagar. He served as the director of CoEP from 2005 to 2015. He also held other responsibilities such as chairman of the empowered Basic Science Research (BSR) Committee of the UGC and chairman BoG, NIT-Arunachal Pradesh, He was Chairman of AICTE from July 2015 till 1 September 2022. Currently from 2 September 2022 he is the chairman of NETF.

== Awards and fellowships ==
- National Merit Scholarship from 1973 to 1980
- First rank in all ten semesters during B.E. (Karnataka University)
- Karnataka University Gold Medal and Cash Prize
- Adjudged as the Best Student in the Engineering College (1980) and received a Rolling Shield
- U.G.C. Fellowship during Doctoral Programme
- Maha-Intrapreneur Award 2011 of Praj Industries
- Edupreneur Award 2013 from Engineering Watch
- Jeevan Gaurav Puraskar, Life Time Achievement Award of MIT World Peace University
- Gandhian Peace Award of CSR Times and Indian Achievers Forum
- Ravi J Matthai National Fellowship Award from AIMS

== Memberships of professional bodies, societies and committees ==
- Life Member, Acoustical Society of India : LM-267
- Life Member, and Fellow Indian Society for Technical Education : LM-11116
- Served as Chairman of I.S.T.E., North Eastern Regional Institute of Science and Technology (NERIST), Itanagar Chapter
- Fellow, Institution of Engineers : F/108821/8
- Member, ASME : 100078512
- Fellow, Institution of Engineering and Technology
- Fellow, Indian National Academy of Engineering (INAE)
