= Comparative endocrinology =

Comparative endocrinology focuses on the complexities of vertebrate and invertebrate endocrine systems across sub-molecular, molecular, cellular, and organismal levels of analysis. It is an interdisciplinary field that bridges biology and medicine, addressing the morphological and functional aspects of organismal development. The discovery of new hormones often first occurs in model organisms before their orthologs are identified in mammals.

== See also ==
- Endocrinology
- Pediatric endocrinology
- Neuroendocrinology
- Reproductive endocrinology
- Hormone
- Endocrine disease
- Interdisciplinary sub-specialties of medicine
