= Karnatak Lingayat Education Society =

Education Healthcare Research

- Type: Public Charitable Trust
- Established: November 13, 1916 (109 years ago)
- Chairman: Kshitij Badachi
- Students: 1.38 Lakhs
- Location: Belagavi, India
- Website: www.klesociety.org

Karnataka Lingayat Education Society (KLE Society) is headquartered at Belagavi, Karnataka. KLE Society runs over 300 institutions engaged in education, healthcare and research in Karnataka and Maharashtra. The educational institutions have over 1,30,000 students and the number of people employed across all institutions is over 16000.

The healthcare institutions of KLE have a combined capacity of over 4000 beds including 1700 charitable beds that offer services to the needy at subsidized costs. KLE Dr Prabhakar Kore Hospital and Medical Research Centre is a super specialty multi organ transplant centre which is renowned for heart, liver and kidney transplants.

== Founders ==
Founder Life Members- Seven Teachers- "Saptarishis"

- S.S. Basavanal (1893 – 1951)
- B.B. Mamadapur (1887 – 1976)
- M.R. Sakhare (1892–1951)
- H.F. Kattimani (1889 –1964)
- B.S. Hanchinal (1891 – 1979)
- P.R. Chikodi (1884–1961)
- V.V. Patil (1888 –1979)

Founder Patrons:

- Rao Bahadur Rudragouda Chanagouda Artal (1851–1932)
- Rao Bahadur V G Naik-Chachadi (1882–1969)
- Rao Bahadur Vaijappa Anigol (1877–1946)

== History & Milestones ==
1916- Establishment of KLE Society's G.A. High School (Anglo Vernacular), Belagavi in 1916 to facilitate "Empowerment through Education", especially for the farming folk in the region.

1933 & 1935- Establishment of KLE Society's Lingaraj College, Belagavi and KLE Raja Lakhamgouda Science Institute at Belagavi to provide opportunities for higher education

1937- Commencement of first Marathi Medium School, KLE Annappa Kadadi High School at Solapur, Maharashtra

1940- Establishment of KLE Society's S.S.Basavanal Teachers' Training Institute, Belagavi

1947- Commencement of KLE B.V. Bhoomraddi College of Engineering & Technology, Hubballi - first college for Technical Education in North Karnataka

1963- Establishment of the KLE Jawaharlal Nehru Medical College at Belagavi.

1968- Commencement of KLE College of Pharmacy, Belagavi

1974- KLE Society established its first English Medium School at Hubballi

1974-KLE Society established Law Colleges at Hubballi and Gadag

1984- Establishment of Polytechnic institutions at Hubballi, Chikodi and Haveri

1985- KLE Institute of Dental Sciences established at Belagavi.

1986- Establishment of 1000 beds hospital at Belagavi

1987- Establishment of KLE Institute of Nursing Sciences at Belagavi.

1991- Upgradation and establishment of KLE B M Kankanwadi Ayurveda Medical College and Ayurveda Hospital at Shahpur, Belagavi.

1994- Establishment of KLE established an Institute of Physiotherapy at Belagavi.

1996- Commencement of Colleges of Business Administration; one each at Hubballi and Belagavi.

1996- Establishment of its first "Concept Pre-University College" at Bengaluru

1999- Established KLE Society's School of Agricultural Training and Research, Mattikopp, Tq. Bailhongal

1999- Commencement of the international collaborations of KLE J N Medical College, Belagavi by singing an MOU with University of Illinois, Chicago

1999- Establishment of KLE's Bachelor of Computer Applications institutions at Hubballi, Gadag and Belagavi

2003- KLE's first Industrial Training Centre (ITC) established at Gokak

2006- Establishment of KLE Academy of Higher Education & Research (KAHER), Belagavi, Deemed-to-be-University for Health Sciences and allied disciplines.

2008- Commencement of KLE College of Engineering & Technology, Chikodi to take modern day technical education to the rural areas.

2010- Commencement of USM – KLE International Medical School / Programme wherein students from Malaysia obtain their degree in medicine at the KLE campus at Belagavi

2011- KLE Krishi Vigyan Kendra, Mattikoppa established to take modern day scientific farming practices and inputs to the rural areas to supplement and enhance livelihoods.

2013- Establishment of Dr Prabhakar Kore Basic Science Research Centre (BSRC) at KAHER, Belagavi

2015- KLE B V Bhoomaraddi College of Engineering and Technology, Hubballi is elevated to "KLE Technological University, Hubballi

2016- Centenary Celebrations of KLE Society graced by the inspirational presence of Honorable Prime Minister Shri Narendra Modiji.

2021- Commencement of KLE Jagadguru Gangadhar Mahaswamigalu Moorusavirmath Medical College, Hubballi.

== Prominent Alumni ==
- Nath Pai - A Great Parliamentarian
- B. Shankaranand - Former Central Minister
- Padma Shri Sudha Murthy - Chairman, Infosys Foundation
- Chandrashekhara Kambar - Jnanpith Award Winner
- Mr. Datar - Legal Luminary
- Dr. Shivanand Patil - Eminent Scientist of International reputation, IOWA University, USA
- Shri Pralhad Joshi, Hon. Union Minister for Parliamentary Affairs, Coal and Mines
- Late Shri Ananth Kumar, Former Hon'ble Union Minister of Chemicals and Fertilizers
- Shri Basavaraj Bommai, Hon. Chief Minister of Karnataka
- Shri Jagadish Shettar - Former Hon'ble Chief Minister of Karnataka
- Shri Muragesh Nirani, Hon. Minister of Large & Medium Scale Industries. Govt. of Karnataka
- Shri Basavaraj Horatti, Chairman, Karnataka Legislative Council
- Mr. Pradeep Vajram - Founder Spike Techn.(Top 10 design centres in Silicon Valley)
- Mr. Umesh Vaidyamath – Top 50 Asian Entrepreneurs in USA
- Mr. Dileep Miskin - Former GM, Forbes Marshall
- Shri Anil Dattatraya Sahasrabudhe, Chairman, AICTE
- Sunil Joshi – National Cricketer

== KLE University Collaborations and MoU ==
- University of Illinois, Chicago, USA,
- University of Michigan, USA
- University of Missouri, USA
- Sunderland University, UK
- Universiti Sains Malaysia (USM), Malaysia,
- Copperbelt University at Republic of Zambia
- Rhodes University, South Africa,
- Middlesex University, UK
- University of Alabama, Birmingham, USA
- Christina Care Health Services, Delaware, USA
- Vanderbilt University, Nashville, USA
- University of Colorado Denver, Denver, USA
- Johns Hopkins Bloomberg School of Public Health, USA
- Harvard School of Public Health, Boston, USA
- University of California at San Francisco, USA
- Fortius World School, London United Kingdom

== See also ==
- Prabhakar Kore
