= G. S. Amur =

Indian literary critic (1925–2020)

G.S. Amur
- Born: Gururaja ShyamacharyaAmur; 8 May 1925; Bommanahalli, Dharwad District, Karnataka state, India
- Died: 28 September 2020 (aged 95)
- Occupations: Writer; Professor
- Spouse: Shantha Anur
- Writing career
- Language: Kannada, English, Sanskrit, Marathi
- Genre: Literary Criticism
- Notable awards: Pampa award, Sahitya Akademi Award, Bendre Award, Rajyotsava Award, Nrupathunga Award, State award

Gururaja Shyamacharya Amur (8 May 1925 – 28 September 2020) was an Indian professor of literature, writer and critic in both the Kannada and English languages. He was a recipient of many prestigious awards including the Central Sahitya Akademi Award instituted by the Government of India.

== Career ==
Amur was born in Bommanahalli village in the Dharwad district. He obtained his Master of Arts degree in English from the University of Mumbai and his PhD in English from the Karnatak University, Dharwar. His thesis was titled The Concept of Comedy. After his M.A., Amur worked as a professor of English at the Karnatak University, Dharwad and Marathwada University in Aurangabad before he visited the University of California at Santa Barbara and Yale University as a Senior Fulbright scholar in 1972 and 1973. He was married to Shanta Amur and resided in Dharwad.

== Awards ==
- Nrupatunga Award - 2020
- Masti Award in 2010
- Pampa Award in 2006
- Da. Ra. Bendre Award in 2005
- Rajyotsava Award in 2000
- Sahitya Akademi Award in 1996
- Bharatiya Bhasha Parishad Award in 1993, 1994
- S. S. Malwad Prashasti in 1988
- Karnataka Sahitya Akademi in 1988

== Death ==
Amur died on 28 September 2020 due to age related ailments at the age of 95.

== Bibliography ==
=== Books ===
==== Kannada ====
- Ninda Hejje (2004)
- Bendre Kaavya (2003)
- Kannada Kathana Sahitya: Sanna Kathe (2003)
- Seemollanghana (2002)
- Kathanashastra (2001)
- Shantinath Desai (2000)
- Amrutavaahini (2000)
- Bendrekaavyada Pratimaaloka (2000)
- Dattatreya Ramachandra Bendre (2000)
- Kaadambariya Swaroopa (1999)
- Viraata Purusha: Shriranga Saraswata Sameekshe (1998)
- Saatvika Patha (1995)
- Kannada Kathana Sahitya: Kaadambari (1994)
- Comedy (1993)
- Vyavasaaya (1992)
- Bhuvanada Bhagya (1991)
- Arthaloka (1988)
- A.N. Krishnarayaru (1987)
- Kannada Kaadambariya Belevanige (1983)

==== English ====
- Dattatreya Ramachandra Bendre (1994)
- Creations & Transcreations (1992)
- Forbidden Fruit, Views on Indo-Anglian Fiction (1992)
- A.N. Krishnarao (1987)
- Colonial Consciousness in Commonwealth Literature (1984)
- Essays on Comparative Literature and Linguistics (1984)
- Images and Impressions: Essays Mainly on Contemporary Indian Literature (1979)
- The Concept of Comedy: A Re-statement (1963)

=== Anthologies ===
Kannada

- Koralu Kolalu: Collection of critical articles on modern kannada poetry (2006)
- Anthology of Selected Plays of Sriranga (2005)
- Swatantryottara Sannakathegalu (2004)
- Avala Kathegalu (1999)
- Selected Kannada Short Stories (1993)

=== Essays ===
English

- The River, the Lotus Pond and the Ruined Temple: An Essay on Symbolism in RK Narayan's Novels (1985)
- Philip Roth's My Life as a Man: Portrait of the Artist as a Trapped Husband (1984)
- The Beautiful and the Necessary: A Note on Emerson's Idea of Form (1983)
- Marriage as Symbolic Strategy in Seeta, Esmond in India and The Serpent and the Rope (1981)
- Theme, Structure, and Symbol in The Catcher in the Rye (1969)
- Self-Recognition in The Serpent and The Rope
- A Saint for Malgudi: A New Look at R.K. Narayan’s The Guide
- Hellenic Heroines and Sexless Angels: Images of Women in Forster's Novels
