= K. Satyanarayana (academic) =

Kusuma Satyanarayana is an Indian scholar, editor and anti-caste activist. He is a Professor in the Department of Cultural Studies, English and Foreign Languages University (EFL-U), Hyderabad, and concentrates in the burgeoning field of Dalit studies.

== Biography ==
Satyanarayana earned an M.A. and M.Phil from the University of Hyderabad, and his Ph.D. from English and Foreign Languages University.

Active in the Andhra student movement during the 1990s, he is the founder-general secretary of Kula Nirmoolana Porata Samiti (Forum for Caste Annihilation). He also edited the magazine Kulanirmoolana. His research interests are in the field of Dalit studies and literary history.

An anthology of Dalit writing that he co-edited, with Susie Tharu, The Exercise of Freedom (2013) is prescribed as core text for the University of Kerala’s course on Dalit writing.

He is the co-editor with Susie Tharu of No Alphabet in Sight: New Dalit Writing from South Asia, Dossier 1: Tamil and Malayalam (Penguin Books, 2011) and From those Stubs Steel Nibs are Sprouting: New Dalit Writing from South Asia, Dossier 2: Kannada and Telugu (HarperCollins India, 2013). These books have been described as offering "a complex portrait of contemporary dalit politics that spurs readers on to make their own discoveries and assessments".

Reviewing Alphabet in Sight in The Hindu the cultural critic Pramod K Nayar writes, "No Alphabet in Sight might well be the alternative history of Indian literature we have been waiting for... The significance of this volume lies in its potential to change the way we read Indian cultural history. It reveals so many speaking subjects, and voices that are powerful but rarely petulant, poignant yet polemical. It places upon us, the readers, an ethical demand, to respond in certain ways, for there are no neutral ways of reading these texts (just as there are no neutral ways of reading Holocaust narratives)."

== Bibliography ==
- Satyanarayana, K & Tharu, Susie (2011) No Alphabet in Sight: New Dalit Writing from South Asia, Dossier 1: Tamil and Malayalam, New Delhi: Penguin Books. (Excerpt)
- Satyanarayana, K & Susie Tharu (2013) From those Stubs Steel Nibs are Sprouting: New Dalit Writing from South Asia, Dossier 2: Kannada and Telugu, New Delhi: HarperCollins India.
- Satyanarayana, K and Tharu, Susie Eds. (2013) The Exercise of Freedom: An Introduction to Dalit Writing, New Delhi: Navayana (Excerpt)
