= Mah Laqa Bai =

Indian poet

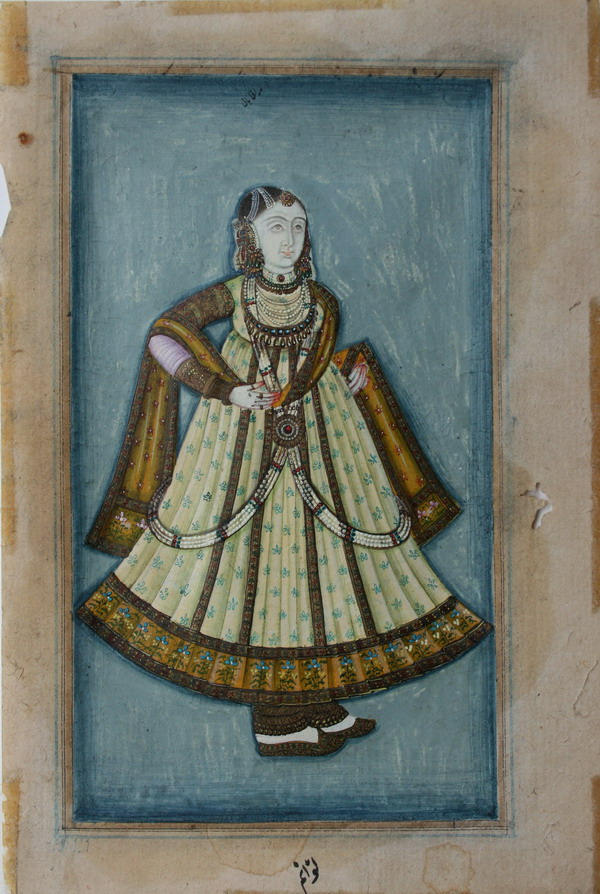
- Portrait of Mah Laqa Bai
- Born: 7 April 1768; Hyderabad, India
- Died: August 1824 (aged 55–56); Hyderabad, India
- Occupations: tawaif, poet
- Writing career
- Pen name: Chanda
- Period: Nizam of Hyderabad
- Genre: Ghazal
- Subjects: Love, philosophy

Mah Laqa Bai (7 April 1768 – August 1824), born Chanda Bai, and sometimes referred to as Mah Laqa Chanda, was an Indian 18th century Urdu poet, tawaif and philanthropist based in Hyderabad. In 1824, she became the first female poet to have a diwan (collection of poems) of her work, a compilation of Urdu Ghazals named Gulzar-e-Mahlaqa, published posthumously. She lived in a period when Dakhini (a version of Urdu) was making its transition into the highly Persianized Urdu. Her literary contributions provide insight into such linguistic transformations in southern India.

Mah Laqa Bai was an influential tawaif of the Deccan; the Nizam, ruler of Hyderabad, appointed her to the omarah (the highest nobility), and as a close affiliate at the court, she was discussed on state policies and accomplished assigned diplomatic engagements. An expert in spear throwing, tent pegging and archery, she accompanied Nizam II in three battles, hunting expeditions and camping. She moved in palanquin with guards and drummers announcing her arrival.

In 2010, her memorial in Hyderabad, which houses her tomb, caravanserai and a mosque, was restored using funds donated by the Federal government of the United States.

== Life ==
Mah Laqa Bai was born as Chanda Bibi on 7 April 1768 in Aurangabad in the present-day Maharashtra. Her mother was Raj Kunwar (born Mida Bibi) – a tawaif who migrated from Rajputana, and father was Bahadur Khan, who served as a Mansabdar (military official) at Mughal Emperor Muhammad Shah's court. Khan migrated from Delhi to Hyderabad Deccan where he met and married Raj Kunwar. Chanda Bibi was adopted by Kunwar's childless sister Mehtaab Ma who was the favored courtesan - almost a regular consort - of Nawab Rukn-ud-Daula, a Prime Minister of Nizam of Hyderabad.

Nawab Rukn-ud-Daula took a personal interest in Chanda Bibi's training and provided her with the best teachers. While growing up, she had access to a well-endowed library and was exposed to the vibrant culture of Hyderabad. By the time she was 14, she excelled in horse riding and archery. It was second Nizam (Mir Nizam Ali Khan) who conferred her the title "Mah Laqa Bai". Due to her skills, she accompanied the Nizam II in three wars; dressed in male attire, she was noted for bow and javelin skills in the wars. Owing to her contributions, the Nizams awarded her with Jagir (lands) on various occasions, that include the neighborhoods of Hyderguda, Chanda Nagar, Syed pally and Adikmet. On one occasion, she was conferred the title of Mah Laqa — meaning "Visage of the Moon". Though she never married, she was in love with Raja Rao Ranbha Bahadur (the Maratha military chief who led a cavalry of 20,000 army men, fought against Maratha Empire under the second Nizam and became his favourite Amir-ul-Umra), and used to admire Captain Sir John Malcolm (an assistant of James Achilles Kirkpatrick, the British Resident at Hyderabad).

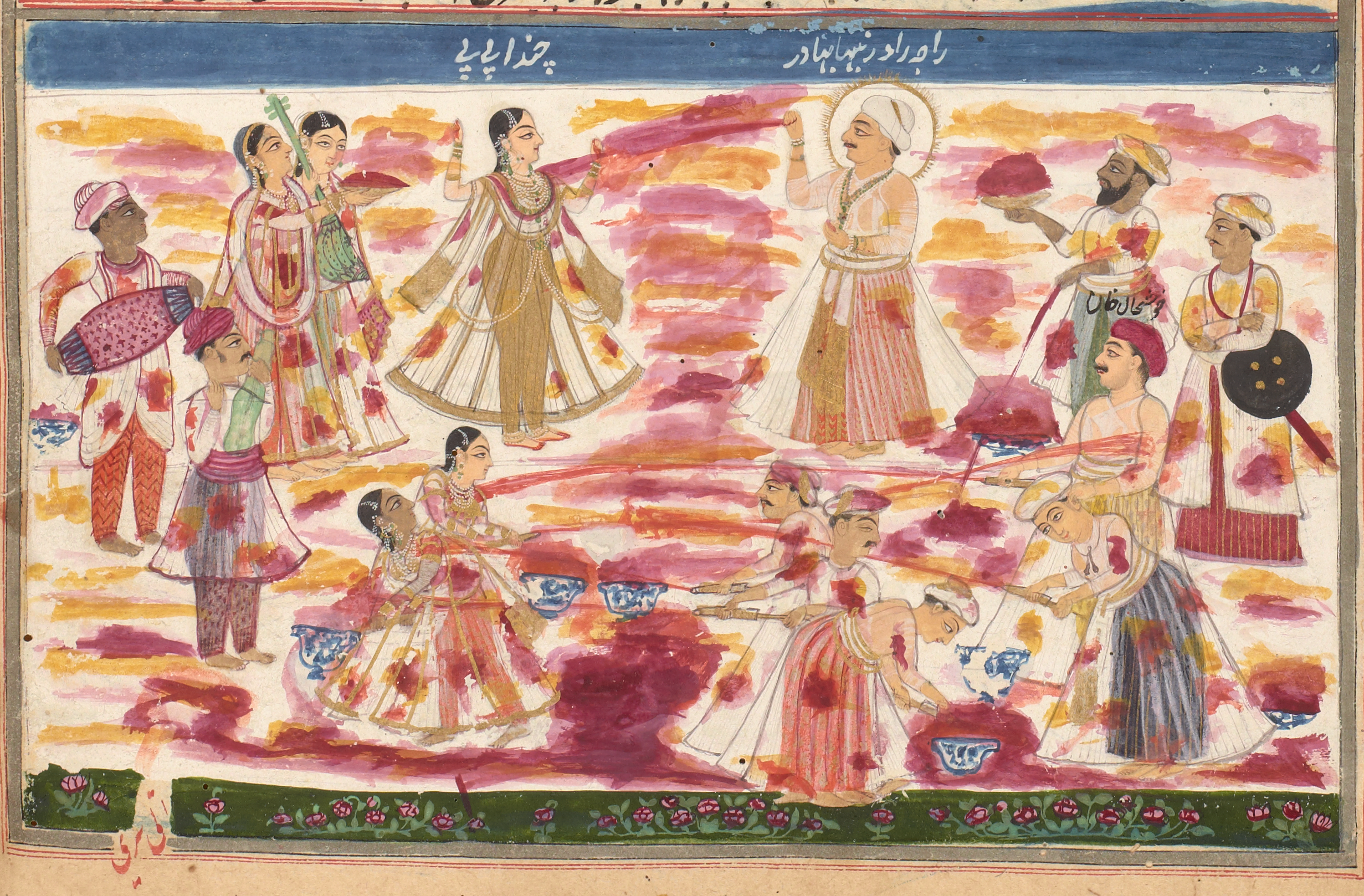
Mah Laqa Bai (left) and Raja Rao Ranbha (right) playing Holi. All three, including Khushhal Khan, are identified by inscriptions. From the Ragadarshan (c. 1804).

She was an influential woman in the court of the second and third Nizam of Hyderabad. At that time, she was the only woman to be given recognition publicly in Hyderabad State. In addition, she was appointed to the omarah, the highest nobility. Mah Laqa was frequently consulted by the rulers of the state on policy matters. As a pride among the nobility in those times, a battalion of 500 soldiers was reserved to march with her while she visits any official. She was also a tawaif while the Nizams held court. She was a mistress of the Prime Ministers of the Nizams. She died in 1824 and bequeathed her properties that included land, gold, silver and diamond-studded jewellery to homeless women. Her residence, which was located in Nampally, Hyderabad, today had been converted into a Government aided girls degree college. Mah Laqa of Deccan was the contemporary of renowned poets like Mir Taqi Mir, Mirza Muhammad Rafi Sauda and Khwaja Mir Dard in North India. She died in Hyderabad in August 1824.

== Accomplishments ==
=== Poetry ===
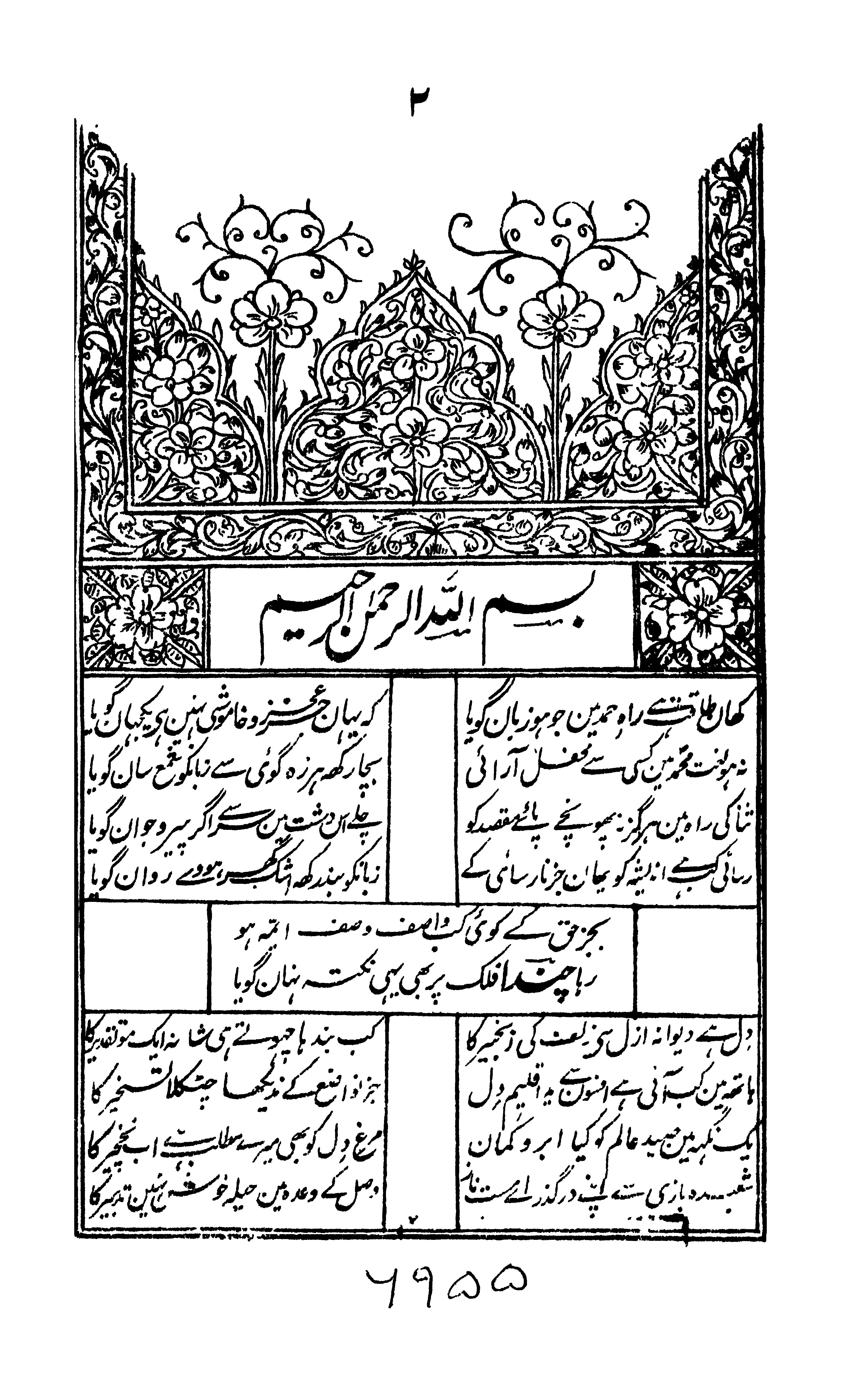
The first page of Mah Laqa Chanda's Dewan

Mah Laqa was influenced by the literary work of mystic poet Siraj Aurangabadi (1715–1763), and learned poetry from Nawab Mir Alam who later became the Prime Minister of Hyderabad State. Her first language was Urdu, and she was also fluent in Arabic, Persian and Bhojpuri languages. She was the first woman poet to author a diwan, a complete collection of Urdu ghazals. The collection, named Gulzar-e-Mahlaqa, comprises 39 ghazals, and each ghazal consists of 5 couplets. The collection was published in 1824 after her death. The Diwan e Chanda is a manuscript collection of Mah Laqa's 125 Ghazals, compiled and calligraphed by her in 1798. It was signed and gifted to Captain Malcolm on 18 October 1799, during a dance performance at Mir Alam's residence. It is now preserved in the British Museum.

Her pen name was Chanda. The Urdu words Bulbul (songbird), Gul (rosebud) and Saqi (one who serves wine) recurred as themes in her ghazals. Her popularity in reading poetry made her the first woman poet of the region to participate and present her poetries in a mushaira (poetic symposium) which was earlier reserved for men. Along with her poetry, sometimes she sang the songs composed by the Mughal Emperor Muhammad Shah and Sultan of Bijapur Ibrahim Adil Shah II. From her Diwan of 39 Ghazal collection, one Ghazal "Hoping to blossom (one day) into a flower" translates as:

Hoping to blossom (one day) into a flower,
Every bud sits, holding its soul in its fist.

Between the fear of the fowler and (approaching) autumn,
The bulbul’s life hangs by a thread.

Thy sly glance is more murderous than arrow or sword;
It has shed the blood of many lover.

How can I like a candle to thy (glowing) cheek?
The candle is blind with the fat in its eyes.

How can Chanda be dry-lipped. O Saqi of the heavenly wine!
She has drained the cup of thy love.

=== Singing and dance ===
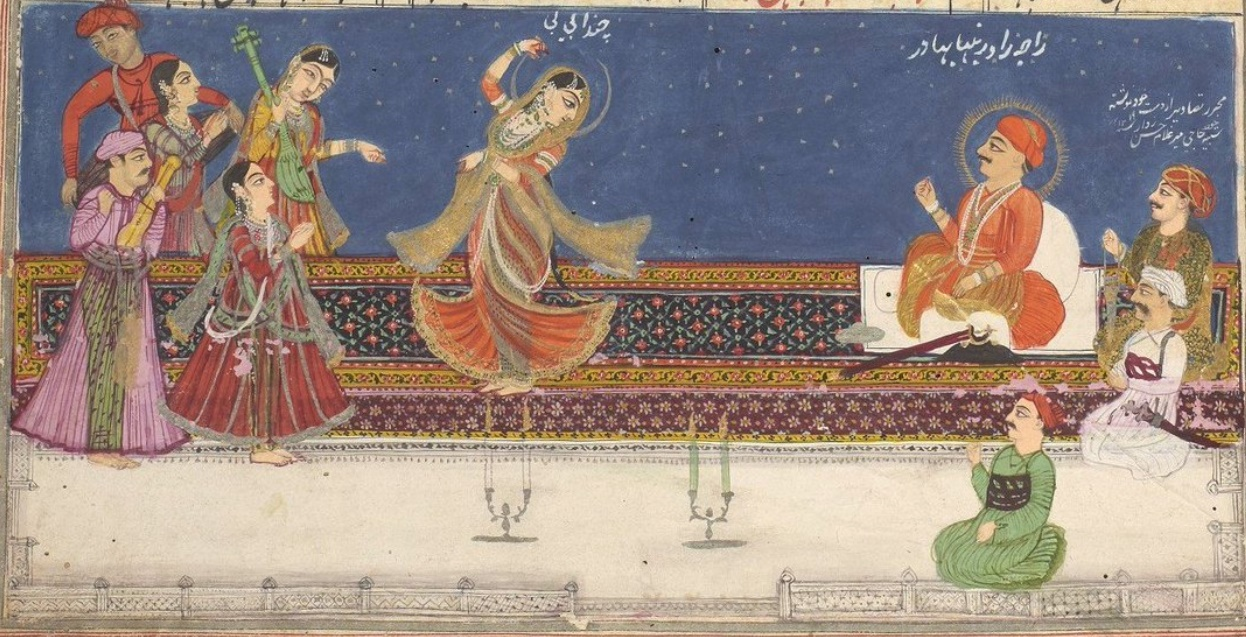
Mah Laqa dancing in court

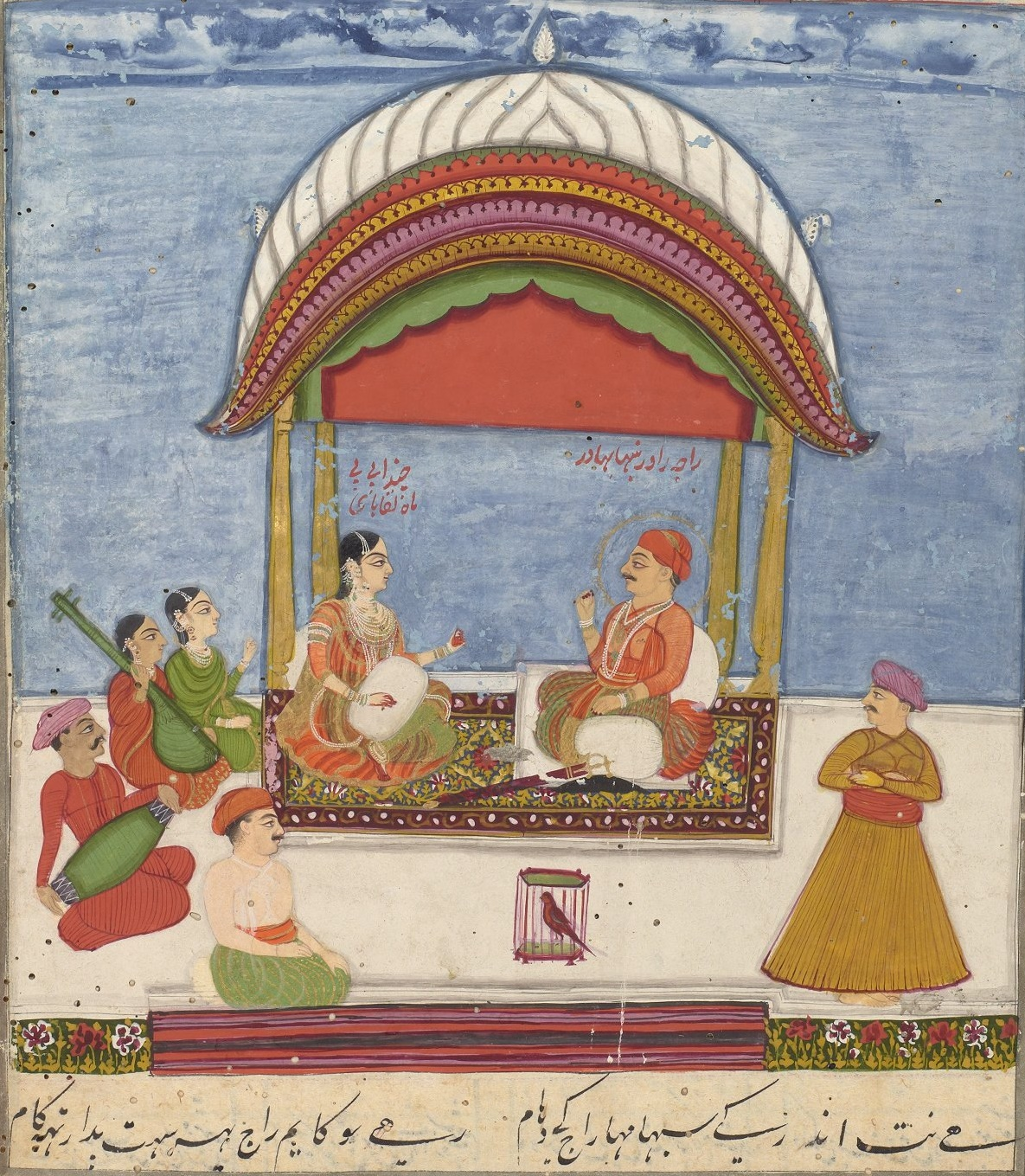
Mah Laqa singing poetry

Mah Laqa learned singing and classical Indian music specialising in Thumri from Khushhal Khan a master musician of her time, and a great-grandson of the Tansen, the maestro of the Mughal court. She excelled in Ghazal singing in multiple raga (melodic modes) and Taal (rhythms); she was adept at the Yaman raga and Khayal Tappa which she used to sing at special occasions. Mah laqa preferred using Bhimpalasi raga in romantic Ghazals. When singing Sufi songs she used Dhrupad raga mixed with taal chautala and raga Bhairavi.

Mah Laqa excelled in singing love lyrics accompanied by Deccani style of Kathak dance which was popular and practised by courtesans in the courts of the viceroy's) under the later-Mughal. According to Pallabi Chakravorty and Nilanjana Gupta suggests in their book Dance Matters Too–(2018), there is no specific written work of Mah Laqa Bai's dance form, various poses captured in her portraits, her miniature paintings and based on the modern research she practised Deccan style of Kathak dance form, which does not exist in present times. Mah Laqa Bai patronised dance and music training centers, she endowed an institute led by her adopted daughter “Husn Laqa Bai” to continue a lineage of dance performers to learn Deccan style of Kathak. According to the miniature paintings exhibited and displayed by Salar Jung Museum at Google Arts & Culture in 2016, Mah Laqa Bai learned dance from master Panna Maharaj and Khushhal Khan.

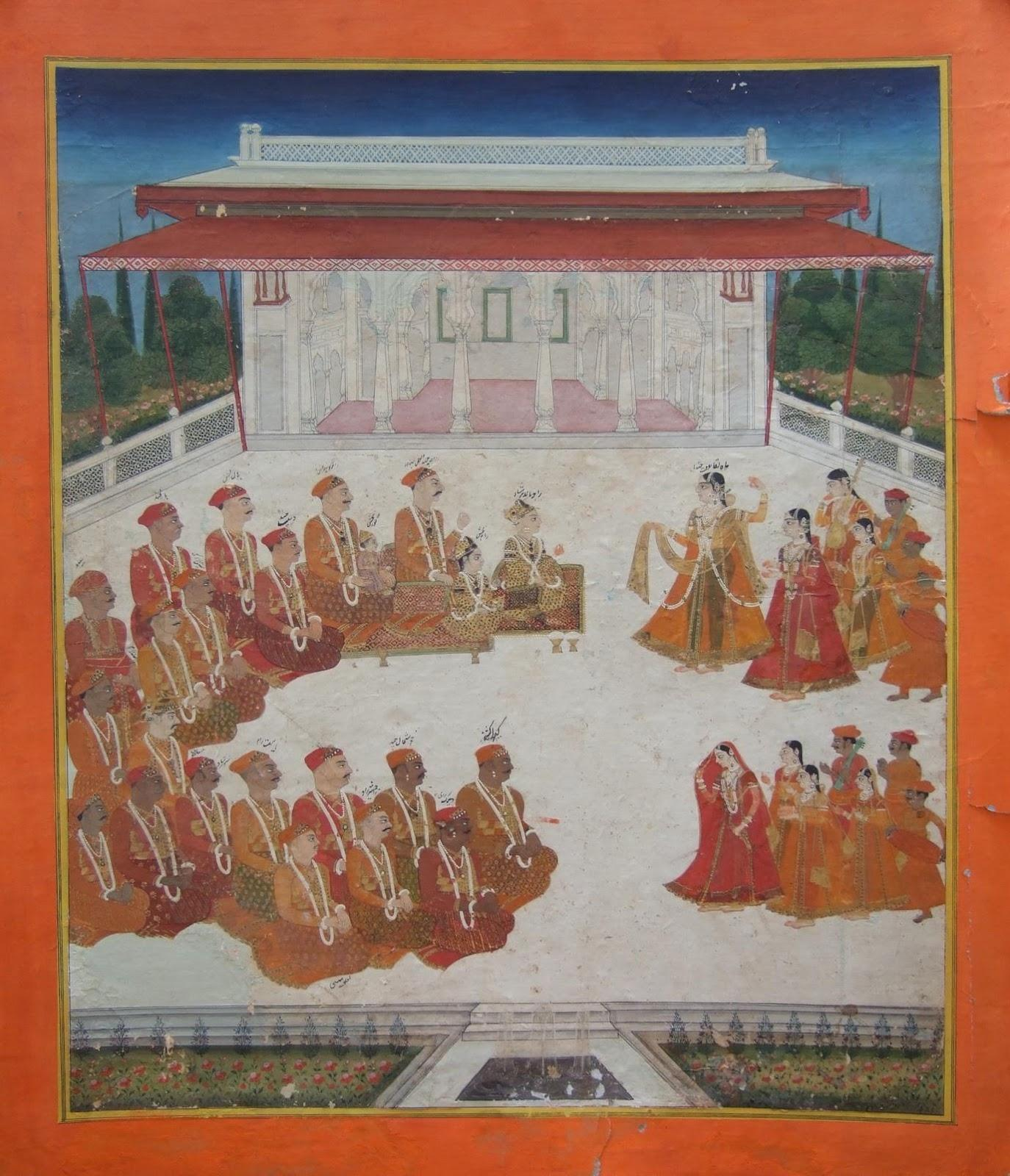
Mah Laqa Bai performing at Maharaja Chandu Lal's court

Mah Laqa Bai established a cultural centre in which 300 girls were trained by her along with other masters. Maha Laqa's library contains manuscripts and books on poetry along with the arts and science collections. She sponsored and supervised the publication of Mahnama, a historical book about the revival period of Hyderabad State. Although Mah Laqa practiced Islam, she was influenced by the understanding of Hindu books and philosophy. One author studied her writings and said that "her verses had a distinct darbari ring in which she eulogized the king and nobles, a common style employed by poets during the 17th and 18th centuries."

=== Mistress ===
After the Battle of Kharda in 1795, Nizam II was defeated by Maratha Madhavrao II which led to the Treaty of Kharda. According to treaty the Nizam II had to cede some of the Maratha territories along with Arastu Jah—(the then Kiladar of Aurangabad) as hostage in Poona. After his two years of confinement, in the year 1797 Arastu Jah successfully managed to influence some of the Maratha leadership to channel his release and reinstated the ceded territories of Nizam II. This diplomatic success of Arastu Jah had impressed Nizam II and he was made the Dewan of Hyderabad. Mah Laqa Bai was initially introduced to Nizam II by Arastu Jah to influence the Nizam II and wanted to be aware of his herem, it was under Arastu Jah patronage Mah Laqa began her career as a poet and upon Arastu Jah initiative her collected of poetry was published in the form of Dewan in 1798 AD.

=== Battles and expeditions ===
Mah Laqa Bai mastered spear throw, tent pegging and archery at the age of fourteen, for which she is known as a brilliant performer and a skilled warrior. She participated in the three battles fought by Nizam II (Battle of Kolar—1781 AD, Battle of Nirmal—1782 AD and Battle of Pangal—1789 AD) mostly dressed up in a male battle attire and showing exceptional spear throw skills. She accompanied Nizam II on multiple hunting expeditions.

Mah Laqa Bai had expertise in diplomatic negotiations, for which the then Prime Minister of Hyderabad Mir Alam could not overturn her. She was very fond of horses, and her attachment with Maratha General Raja Rao Ranbha was culminated due to both's fondness of horses. Once on a diplomatic mission to the Maratha rulers court in Pune, Maratha Chief Minister—Nana Phadnavis was astonished by Mah Laqa Bai's profound understanding of Arabian horses, which she purchased from a French trader for herself and as a gift for Rao Ranbha

== Memorial ==
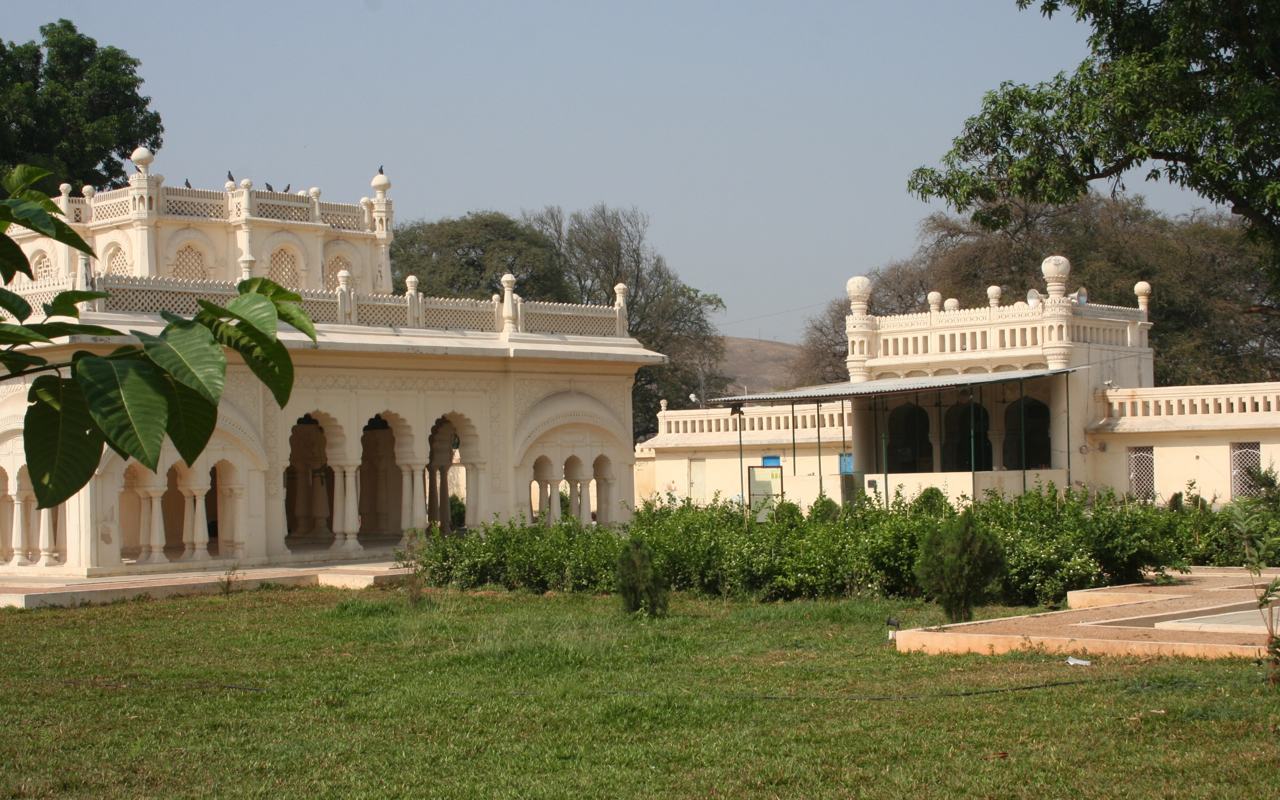
View of the campus area that contains the tomb and a mosque.

Near a hillock in Moula-Ali, Hyderabad, Mah Laqa constructed a walled compound where she frequently held mushairas. Inside this compound, she built a tomb for her biological mother in 1792. After her death, Mah Laqa was buried next to her mother. The tomb was constructed in the Mughal and Rajasthani architectures style in the Char Bagh pattern. Along with mausoleum, the complex contains a pavilion in centre that is decorated intricately with stucco work, a Caravanserai, a mosque and two stepwells. On a carved teakwood over the door of her mausoleum, an inscription in Persian can be seen which translates as:

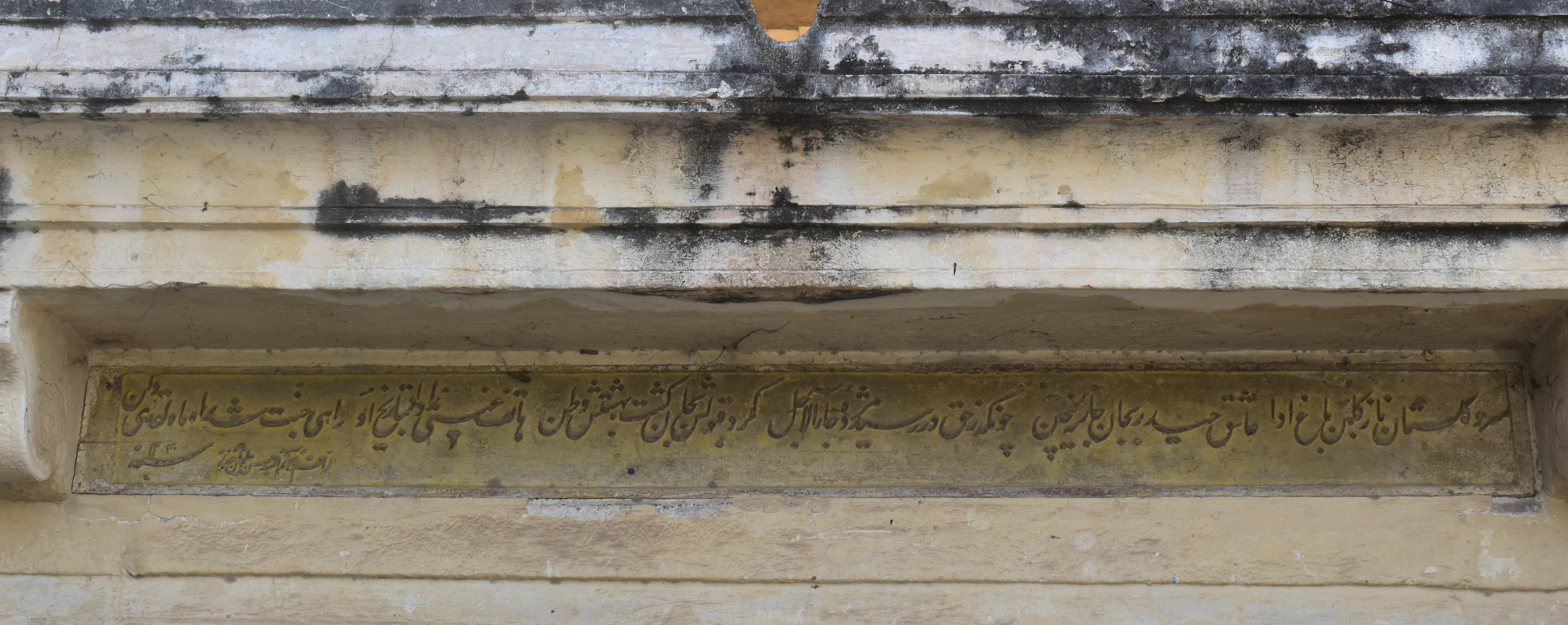
Persian Inscription on carved teakwood over the door outside the mausoleum of Mah Laqa Bai.

Cypress of the garden of grace and rose-tree of the grove of coquetry,
an ardent inamorata of Hydar and suppliant of Panjtan.

When the tidings of the advent of death arrived from God,
she accepted it with her heart, and heaven became her home.

The voice of the invisible speaker called for her chronogram,
Alas! Mah Laqa of the Deccan departed for heaven 1240 A.H.

Scott Kugle, a professor at Emory University and a researcher, studied the life of Mah Laqa Bai. During his study, he came across this memorial in a dilapidated condition. Kugle proposed the idea of renovating it. In the year 2010, by using funds from the Federal government of the United States through the Consulate General's office in Hyderabad, the Center for Deccan Studies spearheaded the year-long renovation project. The Muslim Educational, Social and Cultural Organization also provided support to the project. In this renovation project, the debris was cleared, water channels were rebuilt, trees, bushes, the buildings and their exquisite decorations were restored.

== Legacy and influence ==
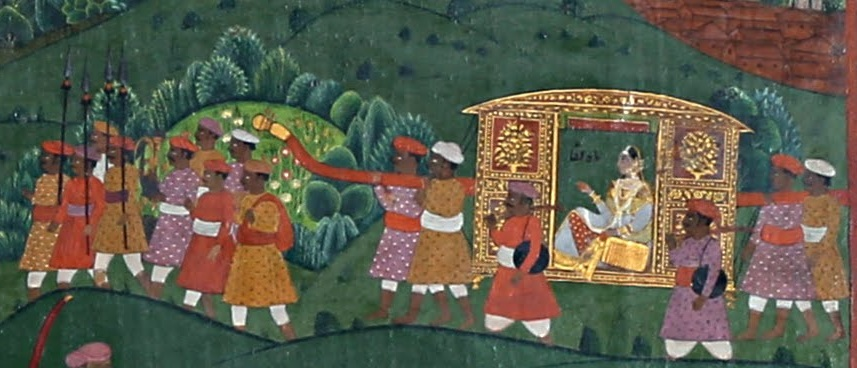
Mah Laqa in Palanquin-(A cutout from a scene of hunting caravan of Nizam II)

According to Sajjad Shahid, Mah Laqa Bai was the inspiration for Mirza Hadi Ruswa's famed novel Umrao Jaan Ada (1899), Umrao Jaan Ada is referred to as the first true novel of Urdu literature. Abdul Halim Sharar presented Mah Laqa Bai in his Urdu novel Husan Kay Dakoo (the robbers of beauty) (1913–1914) as a well-informed lady who got benefits from the modern educational system. Narendra Luther, posits that Mah Laqa Bai, the first women poet of India whose anthology was ever published "brought much pride to Hyderabad". In a seminar "Mad and divine women" (2011) Scott Kugle — a professor at Emory University, expressed that Mah Laqa Bai, besides being an aristocratic tawaif, was a devoted mystic, and was enamored by Sufi and bhakti elements.

In 2013, during the Hyderabad heritage festival, a monologue stage play "Mah Laqa Bai Chanda" on the life of Mah Laqa was sponsored by Andhra Pradesh State Tourism Department. The play was directed by Vinay Varma; Ratika Sant Keswani played the role of Mah Laqa Bai. EFLU Hyderabad heritage well was named after her. It was originally called as Mah Laqa Chanda Bai's well.

== See also ==
- Raja Rao Ranbha Bahadur
