= Khushhal Khan =

Khushhal Khan may refer to:

- Khushhal Khan (musician)
- Khushhal Khan (actor)
