= Mehtab Kunwar Bai =

Indian tawaif

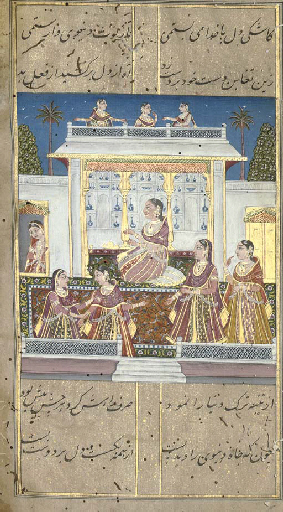
- Possible depiction of Mehtab from a painting depicting the story of Kalila and Dimna, c.18th century
- Born: 18th century Rajputana (present day Rajasthan), India
- Died: Hyderabad, India
- Father: Salim Singh of Deolia
- Mother: Raj Kunwar Bai (Mida Bibi)
- Occupation: Tawaif

Mehtab Kunwar Bai was an 18th-century Indian tawaif based in Hyderabad. She was an influential and powerful woman and later became a favorite of Prime Minister Rukn-ud-Daulah.

== Life ==
Mehtab was born to Raj Kunwar, who was a tawaif (also known as Mida Bibi) and Salim Singh, a chieftian of Deolia who took her as a concubine. When Mida Bibi was poisoned by another concubine in Salim Singh's harem, she and her sisters Nur and Pulan took the young Mehtab and fled from Rajputana to Hyderabad, the erstwhile imperial Asaf Jahi capital.

=== Rise to power ===
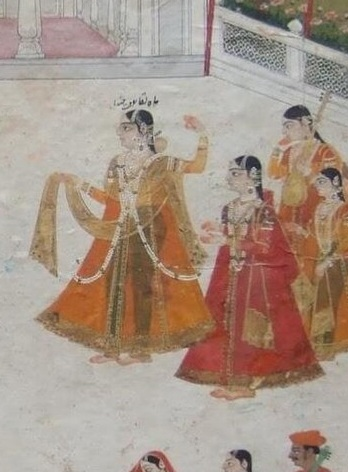
The troupe led by Mah Laqa performing at Chandu Lal's court, Mehtab likely besides her.

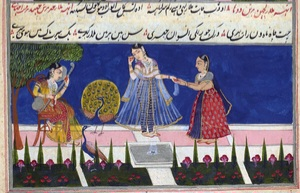
Depiction of Mah Laqa (left) and Mehtab (center) in a ragamala depicting Raga Mallar.

Mehtab rose to become one of the most esteemed tawaifs in the Asaf Jahi court and the prime minister Nawab Rukn-ud-Daulah was enamoured by her charismatic and graceful demeanor. She eventually became his concubine and was given the prestigious title of Sahib Ji Sahiba and gained great power and influence in his harem. She accompanied him on wars and social ceremonies, and whenever she would travel with the Nawab, the imperial army would offer her a salute. The childless Mehtab was entrusted with the care and training of Raj Kunwar's youngest daughter Chanda, who would go on to become the famous tawaif-poet Mah Laqa Bai.

After Nawab Rukn-ud-Daulah was attacked by an assassin while on a tour of Bihar and died shortly after, Mehtab was deeply aggrieved and reclused herself. However, wanting the young Chanda to have a bright future ahead in court, she supported and supervised her education even more intensely.
