= EFLU Hyderabad heritage well =

The EFLU Hyderabad well (also known as Maha Laqa Chanda Bai's well) is a cultural heritage of English and Foreign Languages University (EFLU) in Hyderabad, Telangana in India. It was built during the Asaf Jahi period and is around 200 years old. It is a large stepped well and the geometrical design is distinct amidst a variety of historical architecture from the Nizam period. It is a three-storeyed structure which has five flight of steps, two on each storey and one that leads to the water. This well is in the shape of a square with four arches on each floor and is also a square on plan at the bottom.

The heritage well was enlisted in the state heritage list by the Hyderabad Metropolitan Development Corporation (HMDC) and Municipal Corporation (MC) in January, 2013. The EFLU Heritage Well Conservation Committee from EFLU Hyderabad is the responsible body for planning, conserving and promoting this cultural heritage. In 2013 students petitioned the country's President to call for the well to be preserved.

== History ==
The EFLU well is traditionally attributed to Mah Laqa Bai, a celebrated 18th‑century courtesan, poet and royal adviser to the Nizam’s court. AS of 2013, the well is known to be constructed around 200 years old. It supplied water to her estate and nearby structures during the dry season and later served the British‐era Osmania University and, subsequently, the English and Foreign Languages University campus. In 2008, EFLU’s then‐Vice Chancellor initiated conservation in collaboration with INTACH, but funding shortfalls stalled comprehensive restoration. In 2013, a letter was written from ELFU college students to the President of India to preserve this well.

== Architecture ==
The square‐plan well features five flights of steps—two on each of the first two storeys and a central flight leading down to the water level. Each storey is defined by a recessed arcade of four pointed arches, reflecting Indo‑Islamic elements common to Hyderabad’s Nizam-era public architecture. Built of locally quarried stone and lime mortar, the well measures approximately 12 m across, with each tier about 3–4 m high. Its geometric regularity underscore the functional focus of stepwells as community water sources.
