= Raj Kunwar Bai =

18th century Indian tawaif

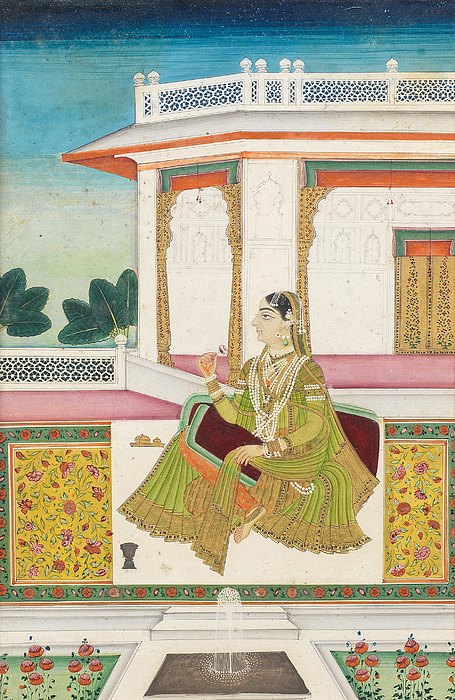
- A portrait of a lady, possibly Raj Kunwar Bai. Attributed to court painter Rai Venkatchellam, ca.18th century
- Born: Born as Mida Bibi, Rajputana, (present day Rajasthan) India
- Died: 1793, Hyderabad, India
- Occupation: tawaif
- Children: Mah Laqa Bai, Mehtab Kunwar Bai
- Writing career
- Period: Nizam of Hyderabad

Raj Kunwar Bai was an 18th-century Indian tawaif based in Hyderabad. She transitioned from a performer, to a concubine, to a tawaif, and gained great power at the Nizam's court.

== Life ==
Raj Kunwar Bai, born as Mida Bibi was one of three daughters born to Chanda Bibi (not to be confused with Mah Laqa Bai, who was named after her grandmother.) and an administrator from Ahmedabad during the reign of Emperor Muhammad Shah. Her mother hailed from Gujarat and migrated to Rajputana, where she met and married him.

While her sisters Nur and Pulan had taken up the profession of performers trained by bhagatwars like their mother, Mida, who was not trained in dance and music became the concubine of Salim Singh, a chieftian of Deolia with whom she had a daughter named Mehtab. However, harem life would prove to be uncomfortable for Mida. She discovered that one of Salim Singh's concubines not only schemed against her and had her poisoned, but practiced a form of black magic on her. Mida, unnerved by the incidents, decided that she would leave the harem once and for all and planned an escape with her family and left Deolia. However, her mother Chanda Bibi died. The three sisters, Mida, Nur, Pulan, and the daughter Mehtab, along with two brothers once again set out to search for livelihood. During the arduous journey, her two brothers got separated from the rest of the women and what became of them is unknown. When the group soon reached Burhanpur in 1747, they took on the profession of deredaari tawaifs (travelling tawaifs that performed in encampments) with Mida, Nur, and Pulan taking on the tawaif names of Raj Kunwar Bai, Burj Kunwar Bai, and Pulan Kunwar Bai respectively.

Soon, they encountered the armies of Nizam-ul-Mulk, the first Nizam of the Asaf Jahi Dynasty, and gained fame and patronage with them. When the capital of the Asaf Jahi Dynasty was shifted to Hyderabad, the sisters moved with his army and settled there as well. Raj Kunwar eventually met and married Bahadur Khan, a court official from the Mughal court in Delhi who migrated to Hyderabad. She would give birth to two more daughters, one of them being Chanda. who she named after her mother.

In the spring of 1768, Raj Kunwar, who was 6 months pregnant embarked on a pious outing to the Koh-e-Sharif shrine accompanied by Tajalli Ali Shah, who was the Nizam's court historian and painter. Just as they were approaching the shrine, Raj Kunwar began bleeding and it was presumed that she had miscarried her unborn child. Tajalli Shah tied the sacred threads around her wrist, offered her tabbaruk to eat, and took her straight to the shrine with her caretakers. Raj Kunwar, miraculously, recovered. Three months later Chanda was born as a healthy child, and in gratitude Raj Kunwar became a prominent donor to the shrine. The birth of her daughter was celebrated with great pomp and grandeur and Asaf Jah II personally carried the ceremonial trays of khichri on an elephant for her chheti (6 day) ceremony at Nawab Rukn-ud-Daulah's palace.

Raj Kunwar commanded great respect in court and Rukn-ud-Daulah would always ask for his mother in law's prayers before riding into battle. On one such occasion, it was raining heavily which prevented him from riding out to attack a fort. He then asked her to pray for clear skies, to which Raj Kunwar replied after her prayers that she had foreseen that in the following few days there would be some hours in the afternoons that would have clear skies. And so, Rukn-ud-Daulah planned accordingly in advance, and found that her words came true and he was able to succeed in his planned siege.

== Memorial ==
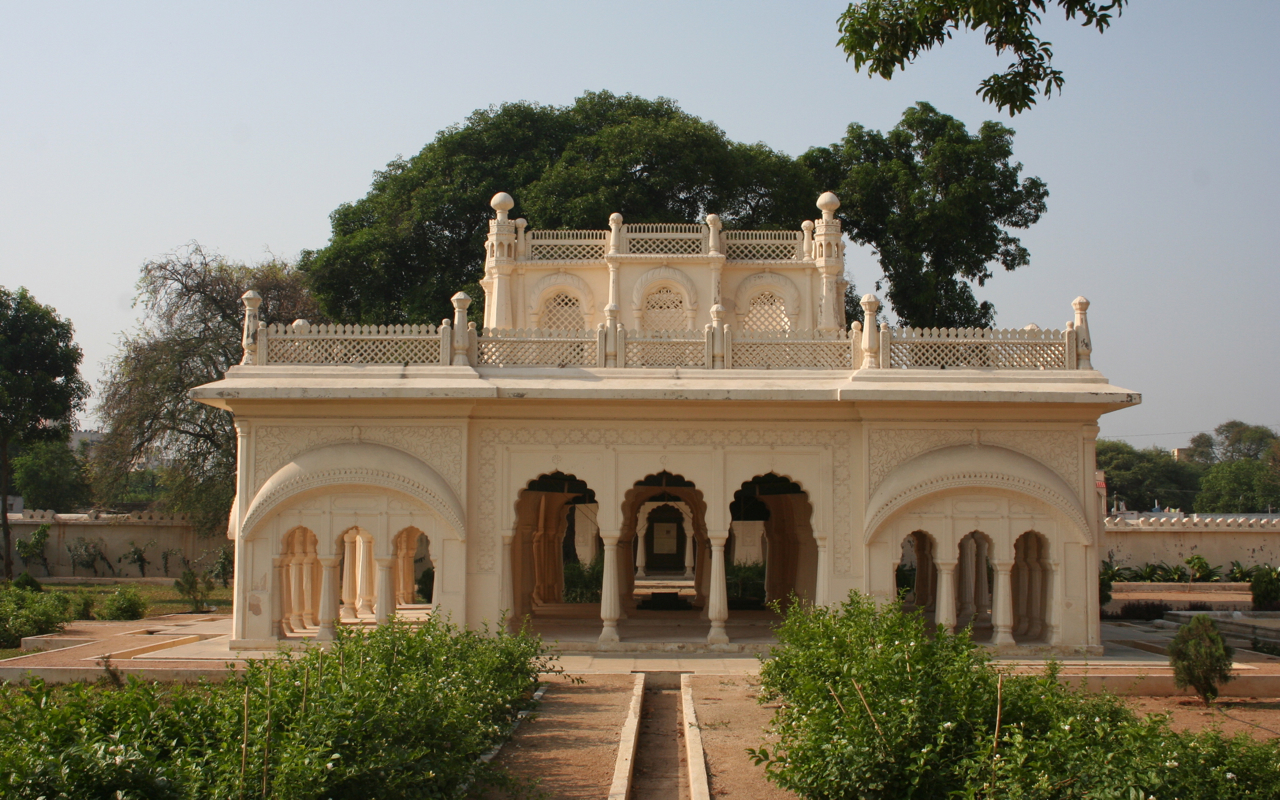
The grave of Raj Kunwar centrally lies within the pavilion.

Raj Kunwar Bai died in 1793 and was buried in the tomb built for her by Mah Laqa Bai, where her grave stands at the center of the pavilion. A series of couplets was inscribed over the gateway and a carved stone plaque at her grave reads:

"Raj Kunwar Bai, the slave girl of Ali, King of men Was in generosity and morals better than the next

When she was carried off from this fleeting world her daughter with cypress stature was perplexed

Her beauty is finer than both Layla and Shirin Named Chanda and Mah Laqa, a moon that waxed

To bring rest to the blessed soul of her mother She built this pavillion where nerves are relaxed

If one says the year of her death is fixed –

Come now, that helpless old woman God nixed."

== See also ==
- Mah Laqa Bai
