= Susie Tharu =

Indian writer and activist

Prof. Susie Tharu Ph.D. (CIEFL) (1978)
- Born: August 13, 1943 (age 83); Jinja, Uganda
- Other names: Susie née Oommen; Susie J. Tharu
- Citizenship: Indian
- Occupation: English Language Teacher
- Years active: 1968-Present
- Title: Professor
- Board member of: Anveshi - Research Centre for Women's Studies, Hyderabad (General Secretary); BODHI Centre for Dalit Bahujan Initiatives (Advisor); Centre for Studies in Culture and Society, Bangalore (Trustee); India Foundation for the Arts, Bangalore (Trustee); Joint Committee for South Asia, Social Science Research Council, New York (SSRC-JCSA) (Member); National Book Trust, New Delhi (Advisory Committee Member on National Biography); Nehru Memorial Museum and Library, New Delhi (Governing Council Member); Stree Shakti Sanghatana, Hyderabad (Co-Founder); Subaltern Studies Editorial Collective (Member)
- Spouse: Prof. Jacob Tharu
- Parent(s): Smt. Mary (Kuruvilla) Oommen and Sri Eapen Samuel Oommen
- Awards: Uganda Government Merit Scholarship, Makerere College, Uganda (1962-65); Jawaharlal Nehru Fellowship (1994-96)

Academic background
- Education: B.A. (Makerere); M.A. (Oxford); Ph.D. (EFLU); Makerere University, Kampala (Uganda); Somerville College, Oxford (England); Central Institute of English and Foreign Languages, Hyderabad
- Thesis: The Sense of performance in the post artaud theatre (1978)
- Doctoral advisor: Prof. Vaman Yeshwant Kantak

Academic work
- Discipline: History of India, Literary Criticism and History, Women's studies, Feminism, Cultural theory, Dalit studies and cultural studies of health
- School or tradition: English Literature
- Institutions: Indian Institutes of Technology; IIT Delhi (1968-1970); IIT Kanpur (1970-1973); Central Institute of English and Foreign Languages, Hyderabad (1973-2013); University of Michigan, Ann Arbor (United States) (2006-2007)
- Notable students: Srivastava Mukesh (1993), Muraleedharan T. (1993), Deeptha Achar (1997), Madhuban Mitra (2006), Satyanarayana K. (2007), Margaret M. Swathy (2010)
- Main interests: Feminism
- Notable works: Tharu, Susie; K., Lalita (1991). Women Writing in India: 600 B.C to the Present. Volume 1: 600 B.C to the Early Twentieth Century.; Tharu, Susie; K., Lalita (1993). Women Writing in India: 600 B.C to the Present. Volume 2: The Twentieth Century.

Susie Tharu (born 1943) is an Indian writer, publisher, professor, editor and women's activist. Throughout her career and the founding of several women's activist organizations, Tharu has helped to highlight those issues in India.

== Career ==
Tharu as a writer earned her membership on the executive committee for Anveshi, an Indian research group dedicated to feminist-theory, where she also served as secretary. She has been a part of the Suabaltern Studies editorial since 1992. She served on the Board of Advisors for The Feminist Press, where she was also a publisher. She has taught in the Department of Humanities and Social Sciences at Indian Institute of Technology Delhi and in Kanpur. Most recently, she and a few others, like K. Lalita, Rama Melkote, Uma Brughubanda and Dr. Veena Shatrugna founded Stree Shakti Sanghatana (SSS) and Anveshi, two women's activist groups. She edited two volumes of dossier on Dalit writings from South India that focus on the resurgence of Dalit politics in the 1990s.

In addition, Tharu has served on the Advisory Panels of BODHI Centre for Dalit Bahujan Initiatives since 2003, and as a trustee for the Centre for Studies in Culture and Society in Bangalore since its inception. She has served on the Advisory Committee on National Biography for the National Book Trust, served as member of the Governing Council at the Nehru Memorial Museum and Library in New Delhi, as a trustee of the India Foundation for the Arts in Bangalore, and as a member of the Joint Committee for South Asia, Social Science Research Council in New York.

Tharu retired as professor of the English and Foreign Languages University, Hyderabad, India. She was employed since 1973, serving as an English Literature Teacher, a Professor of English Literature, and a Coordinator/Professor for the School of Critical Humanities. She is currently Eminent Professor, Department of Cultural Studies. Both her research and teaching focus on feminism, issues of minority, literary and visual arts, and social medicine. In total, Tharu has published six books on these topics. Her most well known work which she edited with K. Lalitha is the two-part anthology titled Women Writing In India, 600 B.C. Her works are most well known for their critical viewpoint on the Indian women's movement and cultural theory.

== Activism ==
In 1978 she helped to found Sthri Shakti Sangatana (SSS-Women Power Organization), an organization whose main focus was women. The group consisted of women active in the Maoist Party. Through this organization, Tharu helped to stop the vegetable export which affected housewives, vegetable vendors, and middle-class women. The organization also has raised question about the Rape Law through a series of street performances and public campaigns.

Later, Tharu helped to found Anveshi Research Centre for Women's Studies. The organization was founded after SSS, when the ambitions of that organization grew too large for her. The organization was grown from the members of SSS and many still retain membership in both. The new organization, Anveshi, is based on research, critical reflection, and activism surrounding our current historical moment. The organization looks to explore feminist theory and ways of understanding issues in education, Dalits and minorities, development studies, health and healthcare systems, legal studies, and the public domain. The centre is located in Hyderabad, India. Tharu has expressed that Anveshi is very interested in connecting feminist thinking and other thinking, as well as exploring why feminism does not easily invite Muslim or Dalit women. This organization also does a large number of translations of Women's writing in India.

== Honors and awards ==
- 1962-65: Uganda Government Merit Scholarship, Makerere College, Uganda
- 1994-96: Jawaharlal Nehru Fellowship

== Publications ==
- Tharu, Susie; et al. (eds.). Women Writing in India: 600 B.C. to the Present. Vol. I and II. Delhi: Oxford University Press, New York: Feminist Press and London: Harper Collins, 1990-1993.
- Subject to Change: Literary Studies in the Nineties. Delhi: Orient Longman. 1994.
- Tharu, Susie (1995). "Notes for a Contemporary Theory of Gender". Subaltern Studies. 9.
- Tharu, Susie (June 1996). "Caste and Desire in the Scene of the Family". Economic and Political Weekly. XXXI (22).
- Tharu, Susie (1999). Subaltern Studies. Vol. 10. Delhi: OUP.
- Tharu, Susie (2003). New French Feminisms: An Indian Anthology. Delhi: Sage.
- Susie Tharu; Anand Zachariah; R. Srivatsan (eds.). Towards a Critical Medical Practice: Reflections on the Dilemmas of Medical Culture Today. Hyderabad: Orient Blackswan, forthcoming.
- Susie Tharu (2011). K. Satyanarayana (ed.). No Alphabet in Sight: New Dalit Writing in South India, Dossier 1: Tamil and Malayalam. New Delhi: Penguin Books.
- Susie Tharu (2013). K. Satyanarayana (ed.). Steel Nibs are Sprouting: New Dalit Writing in South India, Dossier 2: Kannada and Telugu. New Delhi: Penguin Books.
