= English and Foreign Languages University =

Public Central University in Hyderabad, Telangana, India

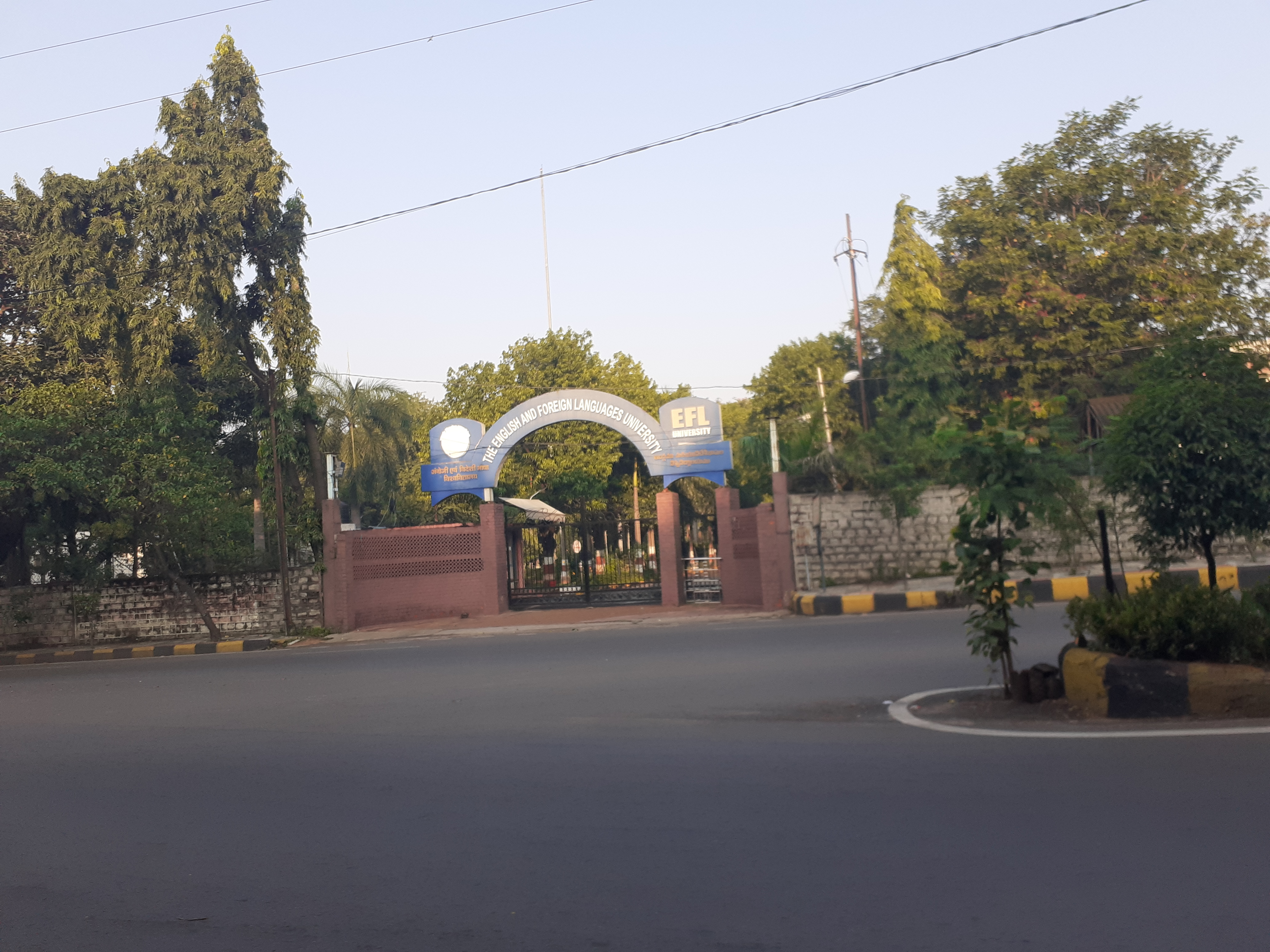
- Other name: EFLU
- Former names: The Central Institute of English and Foreign Languages (CIEFL)
- Motto in English: Words Illumine the World
- Type: Public
- Established: 1958; 68 years ago^{a}
- Accreditation: NAAC
- Affiliations: UGC
- Budget: 101,08,29,461.00 (Operational expenditure) (2021-2022)
- Chancellor: Vasant G. Gadre
- Vice-Chancellor: N. Nagaraju
- Rector: Governor of Telangana
- Director: Rajneesh Arora (Lucknow Campus); Ravindra Kumar Vemula (Shillong Campus)
- Visitor: President of India
- Academic staff: 187 (2021-2022)
- Total staff: 250+
- Students: 1,219 (2021-2022)
- Undergraduates: 300 (2021-2022)
- Postgraduates: 580 (2021-2022)
- Doctoral students: 299 (2021-2022)
- Other students: 40 (2021-2022)
- Location: Via Tarnaka Crossroads, Behind National Institute of Nutrition, Hyderabad 500 007, Secunderabad Mandal, Hyderabad District, Telangana, (Jama-I-Osmania Post Office), India
- Campus: *Headquarters; Hyderabad (Telangana) 32 acres (13 ha), Regional campuses; Lucknow (Uttar Pradesh); Shillong (Meghalaya)
- Language: English (India)
- Website: www.efluniversity.ac.in
- ^{a} Became a central university in 2006.

The English and Foreign Languages University (EFLU) is a central university for English and foreign languages located in Hyderabad, India. It is the only such university dedicated to languages in South Asia.

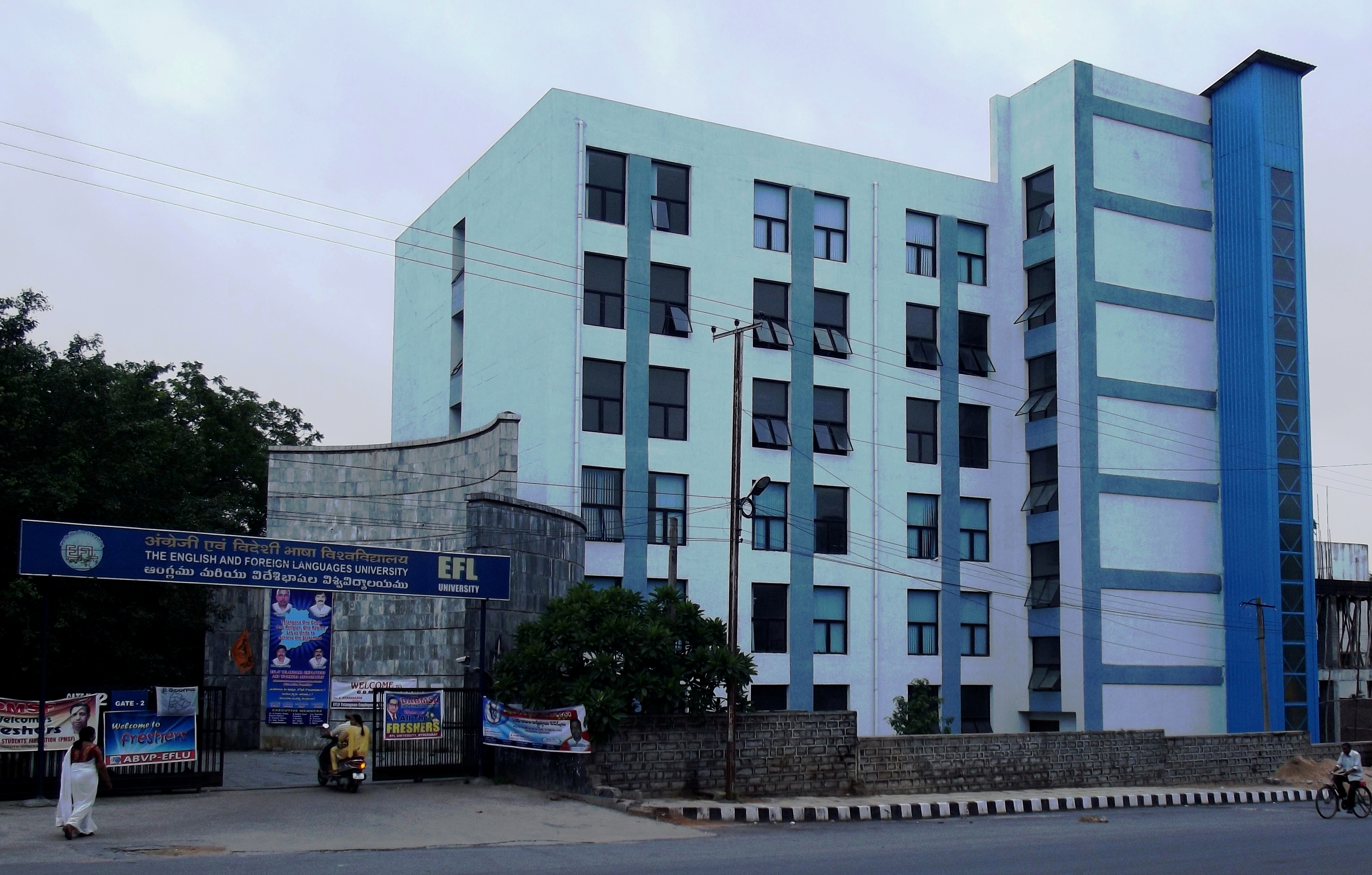
EFL University Campus

The university offers the study of English and foreign languages like Arabic, Chinese, French, German, Spanish, Italian, Russian, Japanese, Korean, Persian, Turkish in the areas of Teacher Education, Literature, Linguistics, Interdisciplinary and Cultural Studies.

== History ==
EFLU, Hyderabad was founded in 1958 as the Central Institute of English by Pandit Jawaharlal Nehru, India's first Prime Minister. The Central Institute of English, Hyderabad had started functioning with effect from 17 November 1958. It was renamed the Central Institute of English and Foreign Languages (CIEFL) in 1972 with the addition of three major foreign languages – German, Russian and French. The Educational Media Research Center (EMRC) was established at CIEFL in 1984. In 2006, CIEFL received central university status and was renamed to English and Foreign Languages University (EFLU), by an act of the Parliament.

== Campus ==
=== EFLU Hyderabad campus ===
This is the main campus, situated in the heart of Hyderabad, the capital of Telangana. This is the oldest of the campuses of the university. The campus has 7 schools with 26 departments. Apart from graduate, postgraduate, and research programmes, EFLU also offers postgraduate diplomas, and distance and part-time mode courses. The EFLU Hyderabad heritage well is situated in the Hyderabad campus.

==== Hostels ====
The campus houses five hostels two for men and three for women.

- Basheer Men's Hostel
- Tagore International Men's Hostel
- Mahlaqa Bai Chanda Women's Hostel
- Akka Mahadevi Women's Hostel
- Amrita Pritam International Women's Hostel

=== Regional campuses ===
The university has one main campus – at Hyderabad; and two regional centres – at Shillong (1973) and Lucknow (1979). They have their own libraries and hostel facilities.

==== EFLU Shillong campus ====
The English and Foreign Languages University (EFLU) Shillong Campus was established in Shillong in 1973 as the Central Institute of English and Foreign Languages (CIEFL) North-East Campus, one year after Meghalaya achieved statehood. The aim of establishing this campus was to cater to the linguistic and research needs of the region as well as to provide quality training for teachers.

Here is a list of courses offered in the campus

- BA English/Mass Communication and Journalism
- MA in English/Linguistics /Mass Communication and Journalism/English Literature,
- M.Phil. and PhD courses in English Literature and English Language Education, along with Linguistics.
- Certificate, Diploma and Advanced Diploma courses in French, German, Spanish and Russian languages.

==== EFLU Lucknow campus ====
The Lucknow campus is presently located at the RTTC Complex, Kanpur Road, LDA Colony, Ashiyana, Lucknow, Uttar Pradesh, India. The current campus is located near the Lok Bandhu Shri Raj Narayan Combined Hospital, a prominent state-government-run hospital. It was previously housed in the Moti Mahal Campus, Rana Pratap Marg, Lucknow. The university shifted to the present location in 2023.

The Lucknow campus of the English and Foreign Languages University (EFLU) was started in 1979 to provide training to university and college teachers of English in northern India, but it slowly emerged as a full-fledged centre offering PG Diploma in the Teaching of English, degree and research programmes. Other than the UG, PG, PhD, PGDTE, and language proficiency courses, the campus has been actively engaged in conducting courses/workshops/training programmes for teachers.

The Lucknow campus of EFLU offers the following programmes:

- BA (Hons./Research) in English
- MA in English Cafeteria [Degrees that can be presently opted through cafeteria: MA (English), MA (English Literature), MA (Linguistics), and MA (TESL)]**Tentative. Subject to change/availability.
- MA in English Literature
- MA in Linguistics
- PhD in English Literature
- PhD in English Language Education
- PhD in Linguistics
- Certificate, Diploma, and Advanced Diploma courses in French, Spanish, Japanese, and Russian languages
- Post Graduate Diploma in the Teaching of English (PGDTE).

All programmes run by the Campus are face-to-face and are not offered through the distance mode. The campus has its own library and hostel. A new campus of the English and Foreign Languages University (EFLU), Regional Campus, Lucknow, will come up near Chakoli. The Uttar Pradesh government has provided 2.3239 hectares of land to the university to build their new campus in Lucknow.

== Academics ==
Dedicated to the study of English and foreign languages, the university was set up to conduct advanced research and training in English and foreign languages, in areas of Teacher Education, Literature, Linguistics, Interdisciplinary and Cultural Studies.

=== Official journal ===
The EFLU publishes Contextures: A Journal of Literature and Culture bi-annually. It aims to contribute to the debates over literary and cultural practices from heterogeneous perspectives by bringing together several departments of literature.

== Notable people associated with EFLU ==
=== Arabic ===
- Moinuddin Azmi, Ph.D. (Aligarh)

=== English ===
- Ramesh Mohan, Ph.D. (Leeds)
- Raghavachari Amritavalli, Ph.D. (SFU)
- V. Y. Kantak, M.A. (Bombay)
- M. V. Nadkarni, Ph.D. (California)
- Susie Tharu, Ph.D. (CIEFL)
- K. G. Vijayakrishnan, Ph.D. (CIEFL)
- Paul Gunashekar
- M. L. Tickoo, Ph.D. (London)
- Raj. N. Bakshi, M.A. (Bangor), Ph.D (Panjab)
- P. T. George, M.Phil. (Leeds)
- K. A. Jayaseelan, Double Ph.D. (Viswa Bharati) & (SFU)
- R. N. Ghosh, Ph.D. (Michigan)
- B. K. Das, Ph.D.
- S. R. Ganguly, Ph.D. (Brunel)
- K. Subrahmanian, Ph.D. (Indiana)
- B. N. Koul, M.A. (Reading)
- Priya Hosali, Ph.D. (CIEFL)
- B. A. Prabhakar Babu, Ph.D. (CIEFL)
- V. Prakasam, Double Ph.D. (York) & (NALSAR)
- T. Balasubramanian, Ph.D. (Edinburgh)
- S. K. Verma, Ph.D. (Edinburgh)
- S. V. Pradhan, Ph.D (Manitoba)
- Rajeev Taranath, Ph.D (Mysore)
- Jacob Tharu, M.Ed. (Harvard)
- S. V. Parasher, Ph.D. (CIEFL)
- Kamakshi-Subramaniam, Ph.D. (Brown)
- Kamalesh Sadanand, Ph.D. (CIEFL)
- V. S. S. Sastry
- Y. C. Bhatnagar
- K. C. Nambiar, M.A. (Oxford)
- R. K. Bansal, Ph.D. (London)
- R. N. Ghosh, M.Ed. (Sagar)
- Damodar Thakur, Ph.D. (Reading)
- V. D. Singh, M.A. (Leeds)
- B. M. Sagar, M.A. (Punjab)
- P. Nihalani, Ph.D. (Edinburgh)
- Vinayak Krishna Gokak, M.A. (Oxford)
- Julu Sen, Ph.D. (CIEFL)
- Colin P. Masica, Ph.D. (Chicago)
- Surabhi Bharati, Ph.D. (CIEFL)
- M. T. Hany Babu, Ph.D. (CIEFL)

=== French ===
- Nirupama Vasadani, Ph.D. (Paris III)
- Nirupama Rastogi, Ph.D. (Paris III)
- Jayant Dhupkar, Ph.D. (Paris III)

=== German ===
- Pramod Talgeri, Dr.Phil. (Munich)
- K. P. Augustine, Dr.Phil. (Halle)
- Brigitta Spitzbardt, Dr.Phil. (Jena)
- Harry Spitzbardt, D.Sc. (Jena)
- V. Ganeshan, Dr.Phil. (Munich)
- J. V. D. Moorty, M.Litt. (CIEFL)
- Meenakshi Reddy, Ph.D. (CIEFL)
- Ishwar Singh Dagar
- Adrian Francis
- Rajiv Shungloo

=== Persian ===
- Ismat Mehdi, Ph.D. (Osmania)

=== Russian ===
- M. P. Pande, Ph.D. (Moscow)
- Yogendra Kumar, Ph.D. (Moscow)
- V. I. Maximov, D.Sc. (Leningrad)
- J. P. Dimri, Ph.D. (Moscow)
- V. S. Totawar Ph.D. (Moscow)

=== Spanish ===
- Sonya Surabhi Gupta, Ph.D. (JNU)

== See also ==
- List of central universities in India
