= Khushhal Khan (musician) =

Indian composer and musician

Khushhal Khan "Anup"
- ख़ुशहाल ख़ान "अनूप"
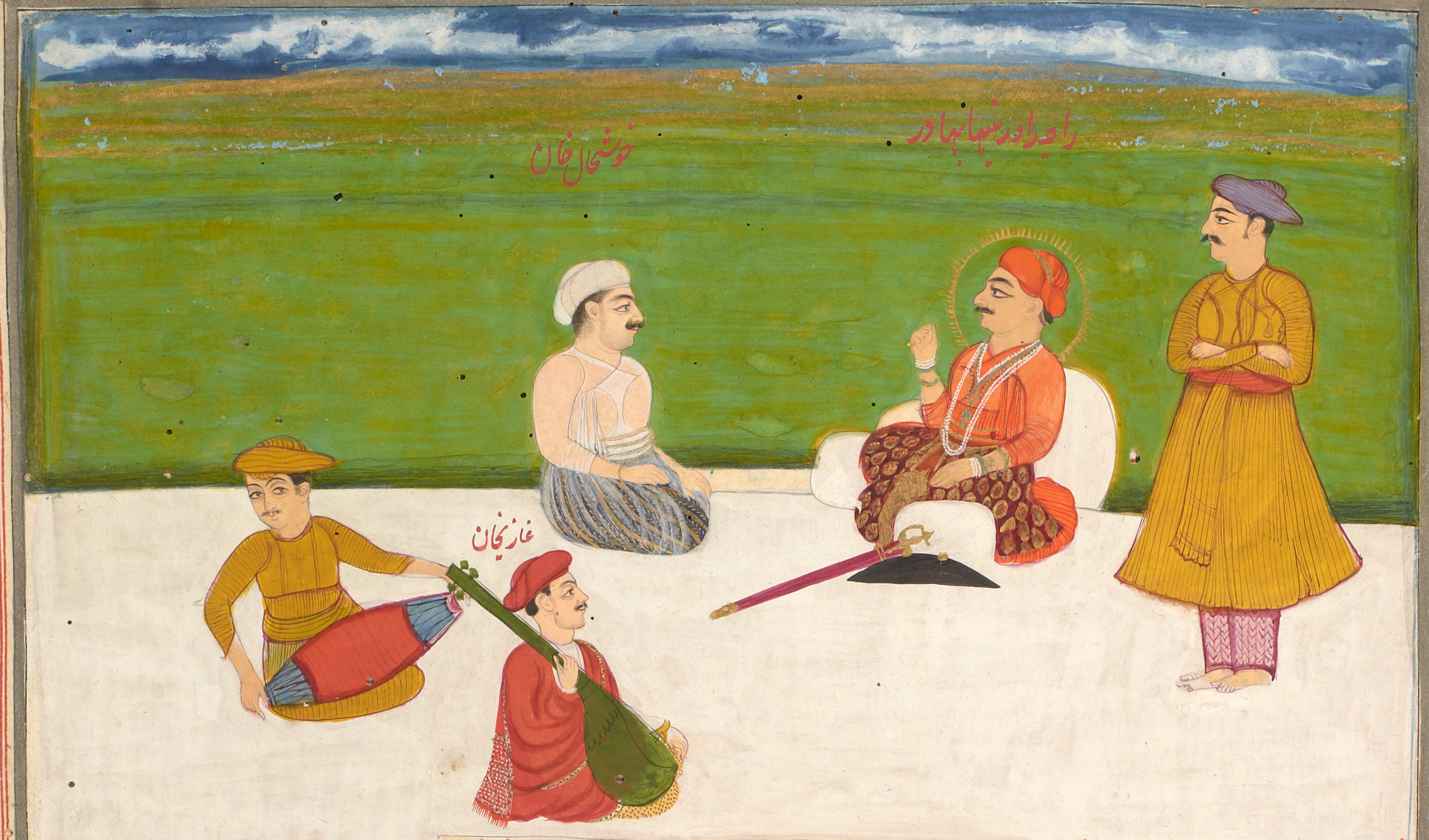
- Khushhal Khan "Anup" (centre) with Raja Rao Ranbha Bahadur and Ghazi Khan playing the bīn, from the illustrated Rāg darshan (1804).
- Born: fl. 1799–1834
- Occupations: Vaggeyakara (poet-composer), musician, music theorist
- Era: Late Mughal–Hyderabad court period
- Known for: Rāg darshan (1800–1815); Rāg rāginī roz o shab
- Parent: Miyan Karim Khan
- Relatives: Tansen (ancestor); Niʿmat Khan Sadarang (lineage ancestor)

Khushhal Khan (fl. 1799–1834), also known by the pen name Anup, was a prominent musician, composer, and theorist of the Hyderabad State. A descendant of the legendary Mughal court musician Tansen, he served as a critical cultural bridge between the Mughal musical traditions of Northern India and the Deccan courts.

== Lineage ==
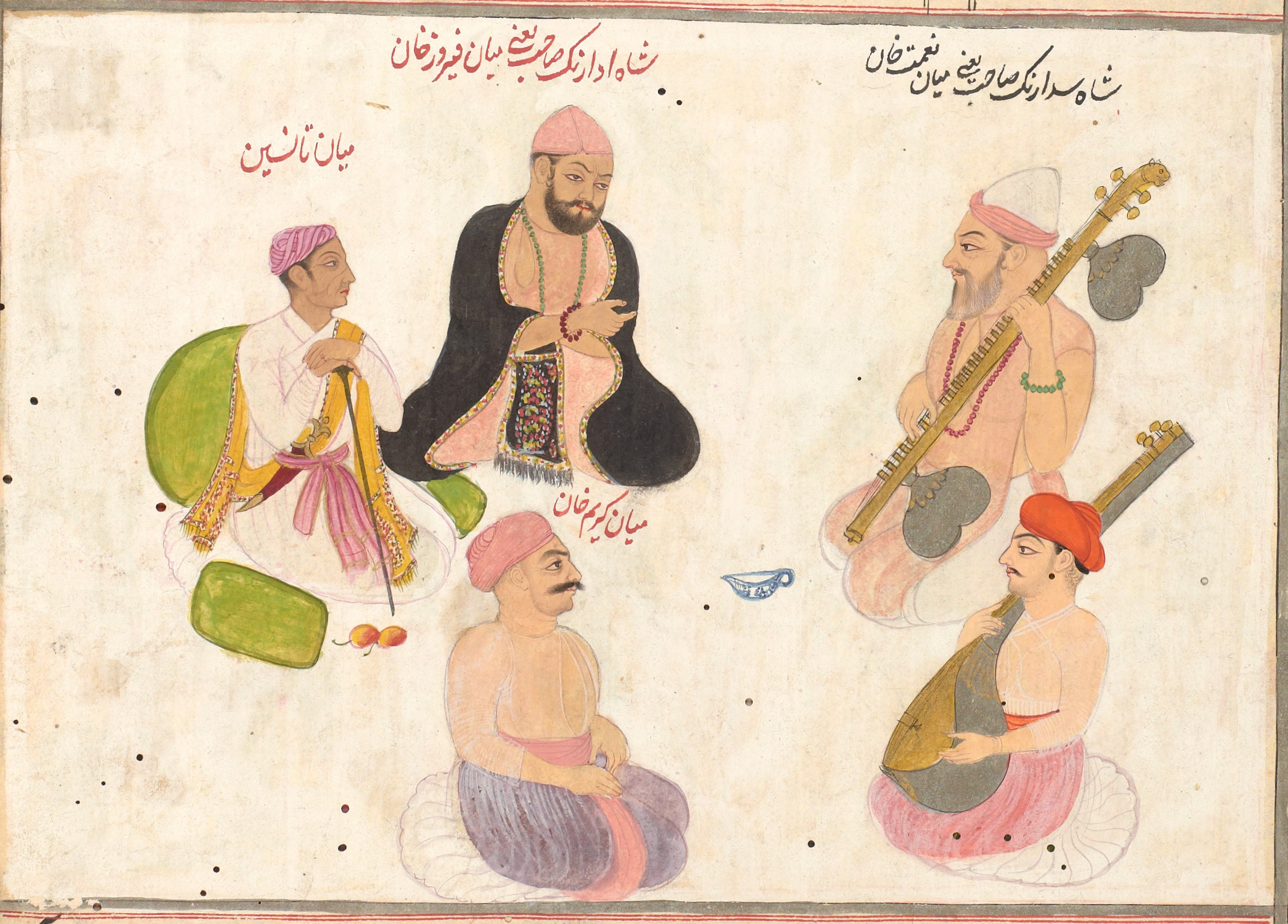
A 1804 miniature from the Ragadarshan manuscript depicting the visual genealogy of the Tansen and Sadarang lineage. The author, Khushhal Khan "Anup", is depicted at the bottom left.

Khushhal Khan was the son of Mian Karim Khan and a great-grandson of the maestro Tansen. He belonged to the elite Kalawant biradari, a class of hereditary vocalists who specialized in Dhrupad and were masters of the bin and the Indian Rabab. Within the kalawant community, his family constituted the Khandari lineage, which he identified as descending from a Rajput progenitor named Miyan Kunhi Khan. His musical heritage incorporated the traditions and intellectual property of both the "Ras Baras" and "Sadarang" family lines.

== Career ==
Khushhal Khan's early career began in Northern India before he transitioned to the Deccan due to the changing political fortunes of the late 18th century. By 1800, he entered the service of Raja Rao Ranbha Bahadur (Rambhaji Rao Nimbalkar), a Maratha military commander in the army of Nizam Ali Khan, Asaf Jah II.

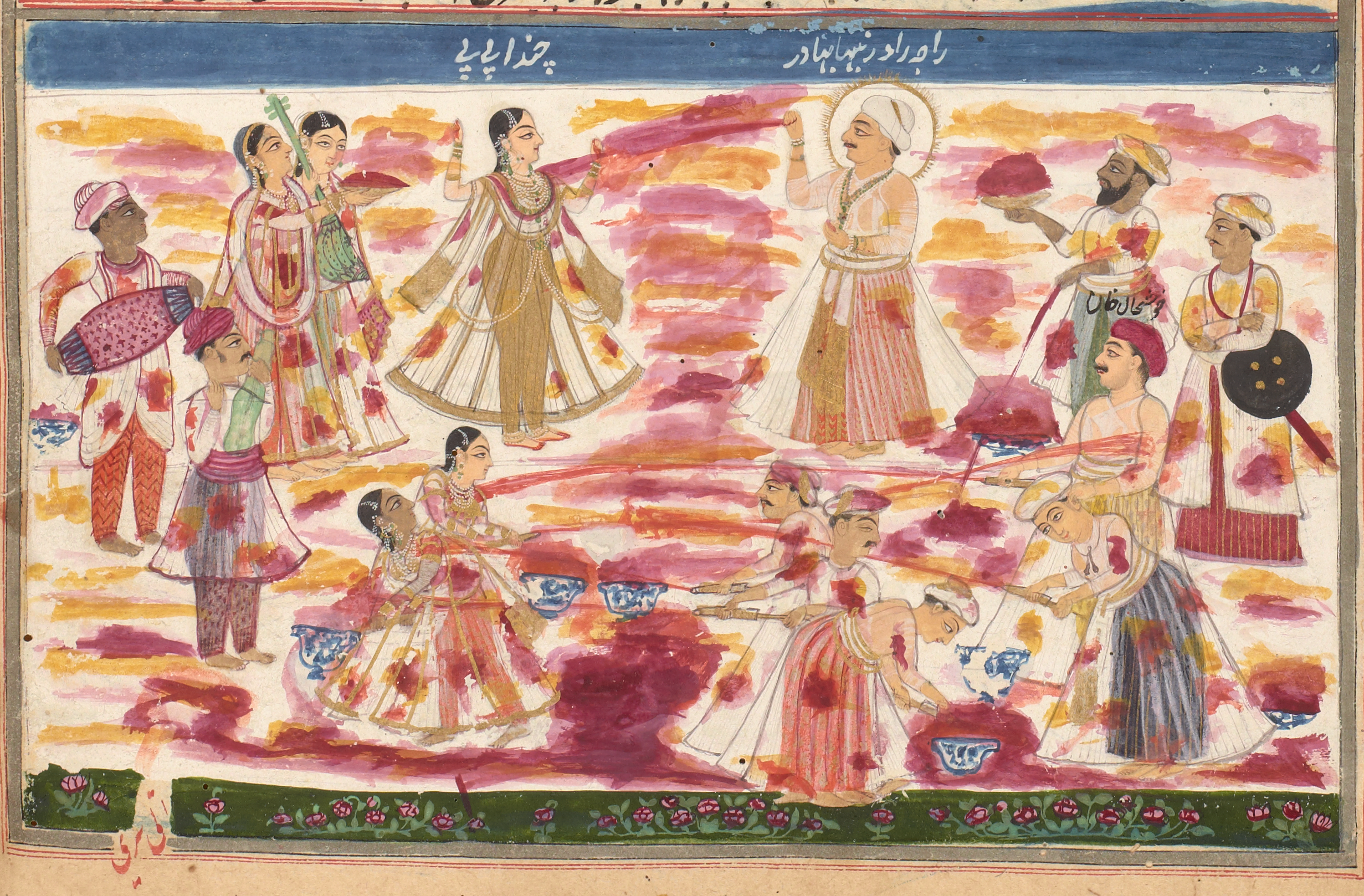
Contemporary miniature from the Ragadarshan (c. 1804) depicting Mah Laqa Bai (Chanda Bibi) participating in Holi festivities with her teacher Khushhal Khan "Anup" and Raja Rao Ranbha Bahadur.

During this period, he was a close associate of the Raja and the renowned poet and courtier Mah Laqa Bai (Chanda Bibi), who was also his musical student and dancing instructor. He was regarded as a feted intellectual within the "exclusive private majālis" of the city, where his presence was a marker of cultural refinement. He later served as a court musician for Mir Akbar Ali Khan Sikander Jah, Asaf Jah III.

== Works ==
As a prolific Vaggeyakara (literate poet-composer), Khushhal Khan authored several significant musical treatises in Persian and Dakhini. His primary work, the Ragadarshan (1799–1804), is a lavishly illustrated Hindavi treatise commissioned by Raja Rao Ranbha and based on the Tuḥfat al-hind.

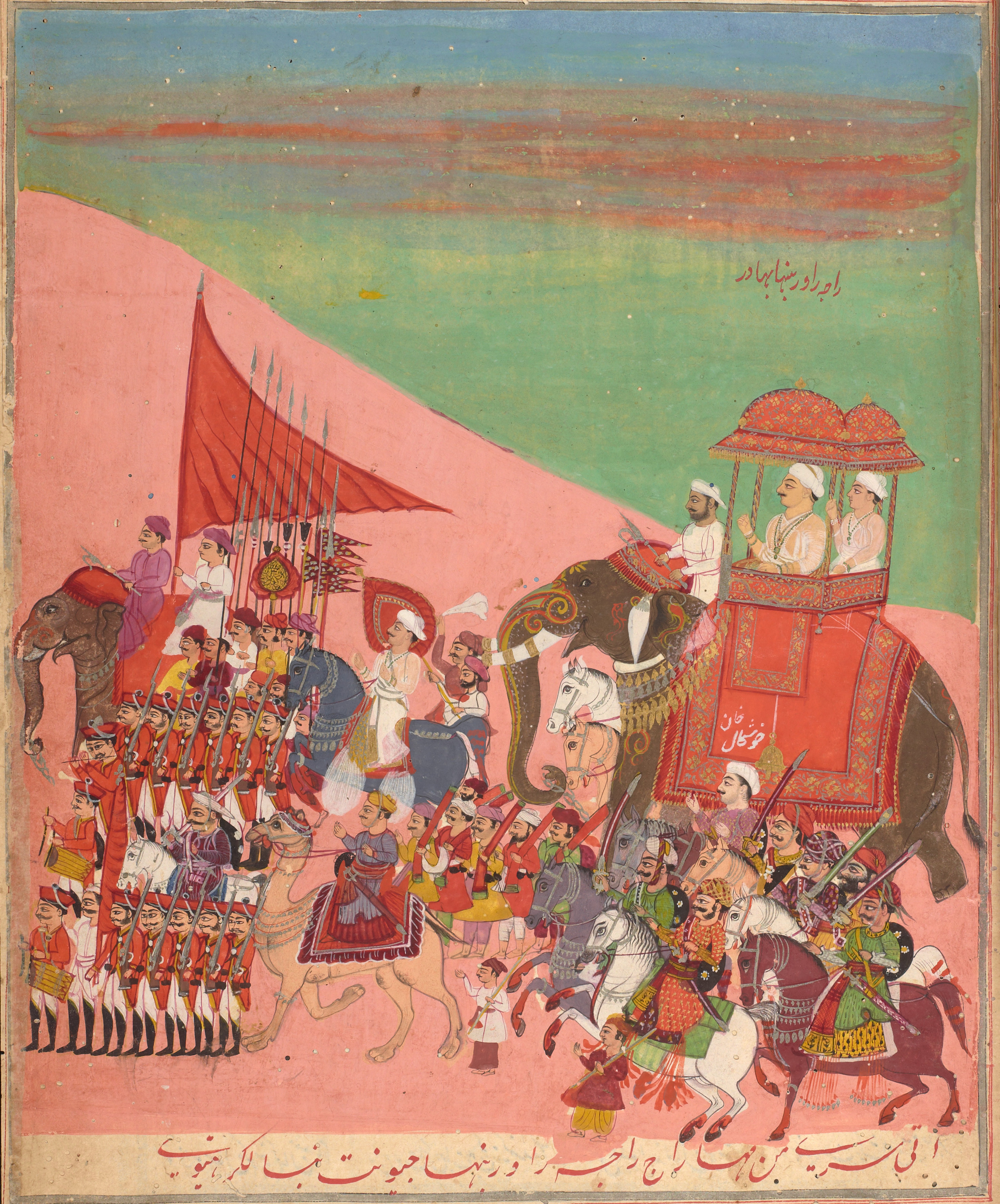
Khushhal Khan (identified by the inscription "خوشحال خان") walking in the military procession of his patron, Raja Rao Ranbha Bahadur. From the Ragadarshan (c. 1804).

In 1808, he prepared a Persian recension of the Ragadarshan for Nizam Sikander Jah, followed by a bilingual Persian-Hindavi version in 1815 for Mah Laqa Bai. His final major work, the Rāg rāginī roz o shab (1818–1834), is a massive compendium documenting the song repertoire of the Delhi kalawant lineages.

== Architecture and patronage ==
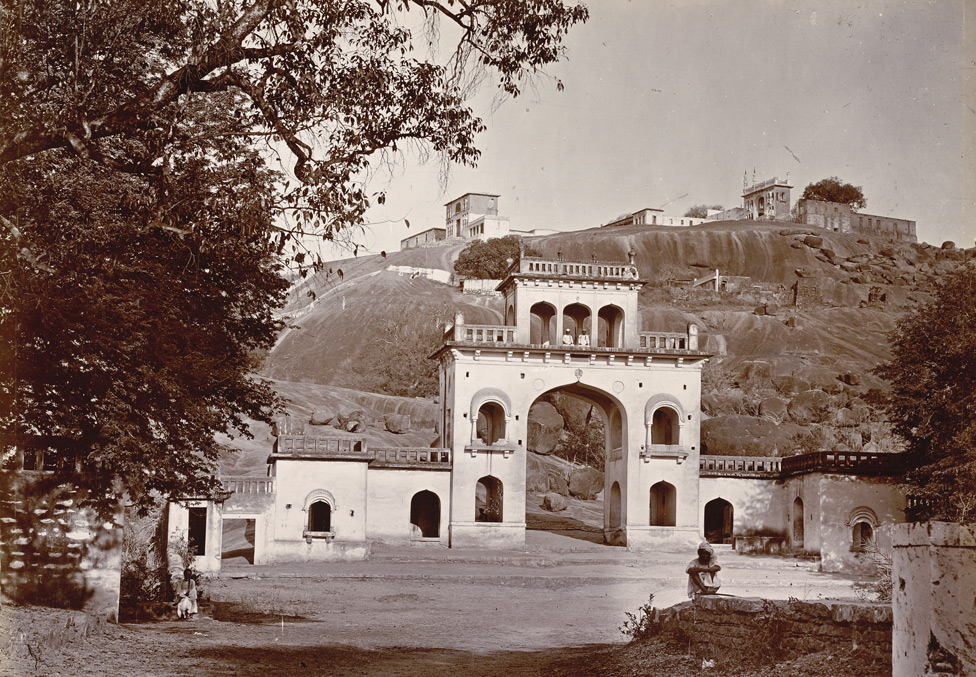
The Arch (Kaman) at Moula Ali hill in 1902, commissioned by Khushhal Khan.

Khushhal Khan was a significant patron of religious and public architecture in Hyderabad, particularly at the hilltop shrine of Moula Ali (Koh-e-Sharif). Using the wealth acquired through his career as a master musician, he commissioned several structures to serve the pilgrims and the local community, including a monumental ceremonial arch known as the Kaman on the route of the annual Sandal procession, an Ashurkhana for Muharram observances, and a mosque and Caravanserai (traveler's inn) on the outskirts of the hill.

An inscription on the arch records the following:

By good fortune Khush-hal-Khan judiciously and inspiringly laid the foundation of the Arch, the Mosque and the grand Ashur Khana; the dignified Mosque was erected with sincere intention.

The foundation of these buildings is dated to 1293 A.H. (1823 A.D.). Following his death, Khushhal Khan was buried in a mausoleum within his own garden on the foot of the hill, situated near the resting place of his student Mah Laqa Bai.
