= Sajjad Shahid =

- Born: Hyderabad, India
- Citizenship: Indian
- Spouse: Shugufta Shaheen

Academic background
- Education: Hyderabad Public School, Aligarh Muslim University

Academic work
- Era: Modern era
- Main interests: History and cultural conservation.

Sajjad Shahid is a native of Hyderabad, India, and a historian, architecture conservator and columnist. He is a visiting professor at University of Hyderabad. Sajjad's articles are published in The Times of India and The Hindu. Sajjad is the former convener of "Centre for Deccan studies Hyderabad" and currently associated with INTACH in preserving Hyderabad's historical and cultural heritage and monuments. He is associated with a conservatory team working for the preservation of Qutb Shahi tombs under Aga Khan Trust for Culture. Sajjad father is Hossaini Shahid and his mother is Zeenat Sajida, both were active members of the Progressive Writers Association. He is an alumnus of Hyderabad Public School and completed civil engineer from Aligarh Muslim University.
