= Sadhankeri, Dharwad =

Sadhankeri
- Neighborhood
- Sadhankeri
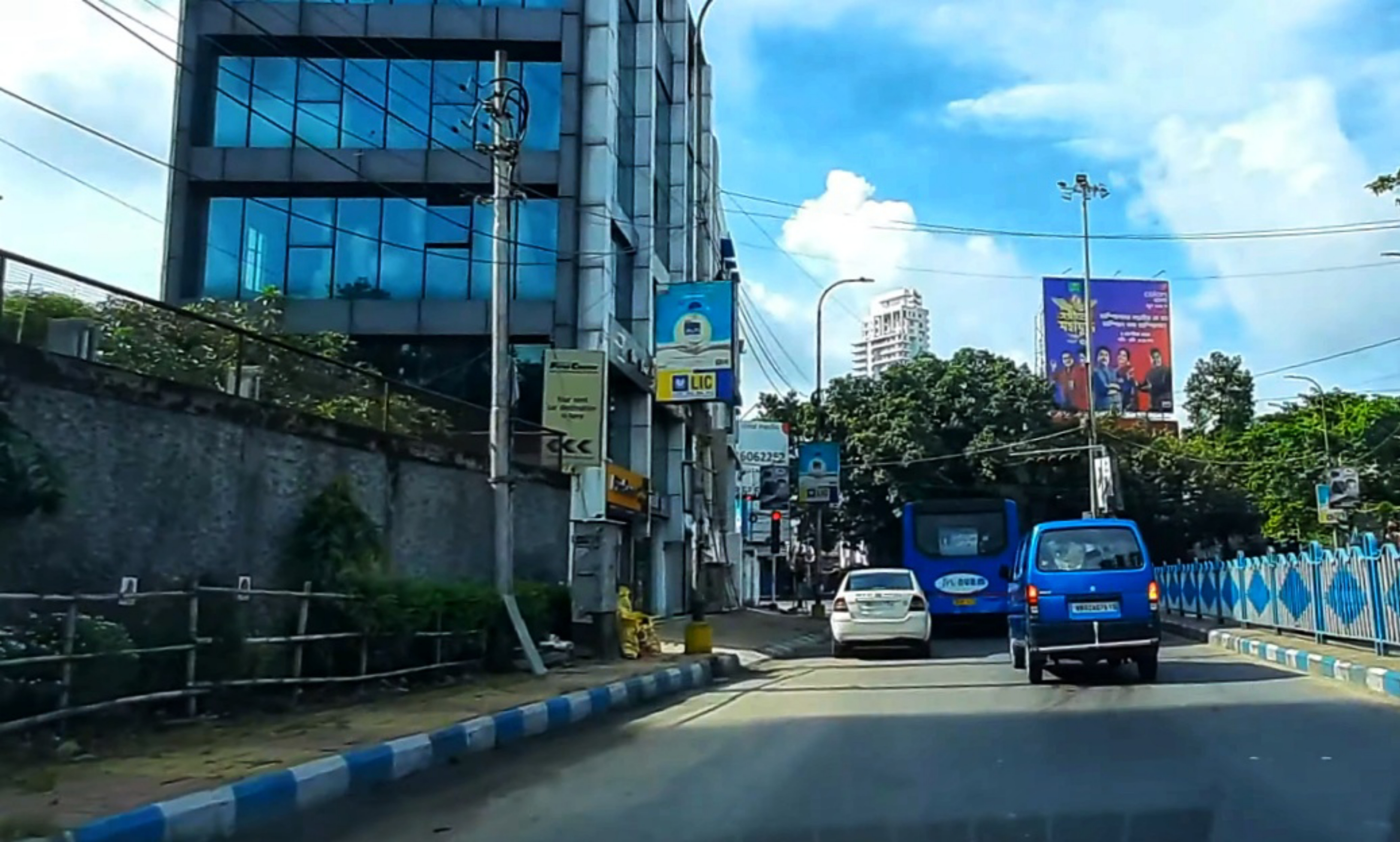

- Location in Karnataka, India
- Coordinates: 15.463°N 74.990°E
- Country: India
- State: Karnataka
- Metro: Dharwad

Government
  - Type: Municipal corporation
  - Body: Hubli-Dharwad Municipal Corporation
- Elevation: 742 m (2,434 ft)

Population
  - Total: 42,639

Languages
  - Official: Kannada
- Time zone: UTC+5:30 (IST)
- PIN: 580007
- Area code: 0836
- Vehicle registration: KA-25
- Lok Sabha constituency: Dharwad (Lok Sabha constituency)
- Planning agency: Hubli–Dharwad Urban Development Authority

Sadhankeri, also known as The lungs of Dharwad city, is a locality situated in the northwestern part of Dharwad. It is one of the largest and greenest neighborhoods in Dharwad. It comprises residential and commercial structures with well-known landmarks, including the popular Sadhenkeri Park (Sadhankeri Lake Garden) which is very close to Police headquarters.

== Landmarks ==
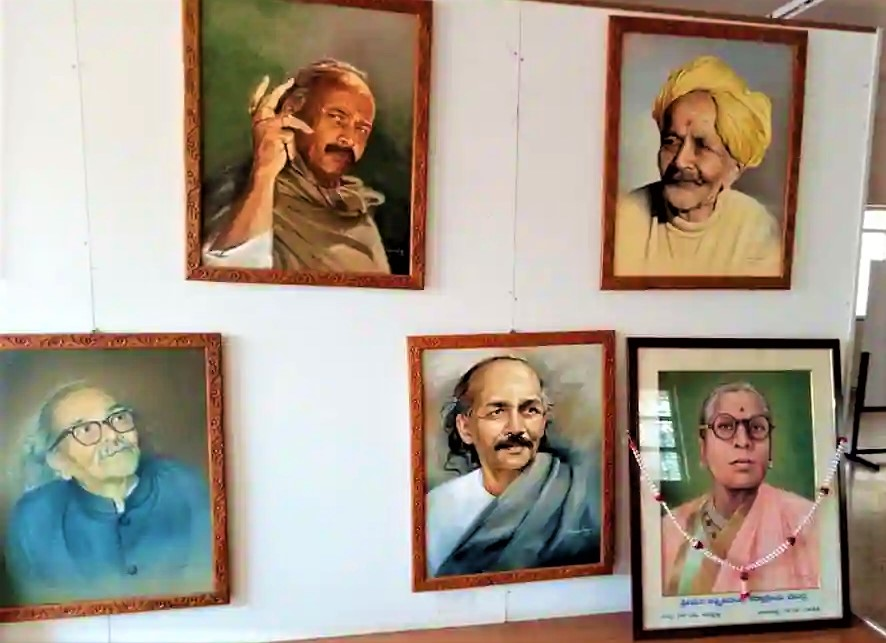
A photo of the portraits of well known poet D. R. Bendre in Bendre Bhavan, Sadhankeri

- Sadhankeri is known for its Sadhankeri Lake park which is also a sunpoint.
- Bendre Bhavan is the house of the popular poet & writer D.R Bendre who lived there for many years and also comes from Sadhankeri.
- Police quarters is located in Sadhankeri. It's not a public place but a well known area comes under Sadhankeri.

== Sadhankeri Garden ==
Sadhankeri Lake (Lake is ‘’keri’’ in Kannada language), located near the police head quarters and is adjoint to the Sadhankeri park. The lake also has boating faculty which is a part of the park, there is also a 1.5 km walkway on the periphery of the lake with shaded stone benches for visitors to sit, relax and enjoy the scenic serenity of the lake.

== Health Care ==
There list of hospitals & health care centers are given below.

- German Hospital
- Our Lady of Lourdes hospital & school of nursing
- Government primary health care hospital
- Shravya hospital
- Dr. Kalwad's health care clinic
- Nadaf dental hospital.

== Location ==
The distance from Sadhankeri to Hubballi Airport is about 21 km (13 mi) and to the Dharwad bus terminal is just 3 km (1.9 mi).

To board a intercity bus one has to yet board another bus to Central Bus Station (CBT) Nehru Market and then continue to get to another locality.

== See also ==
- D. R. Bendre
- Kelgeri
- Saptapur
- Saraswatpur
- List of lakes of India
