= Rajyotsava Awards (2012) =

Awards given by the government of Karnataka, India

2012 Rajyotsava Awards
- Date: 1 November 2012
- Location: Bangalore, Karnataka
- Country: India
- Presented by: Government of Karnataka

The Karnataka Rajyotsava Award is a civilian award given annually in the Indian state of Karnataka. The following is a list of recipients of the award from the year 2012.

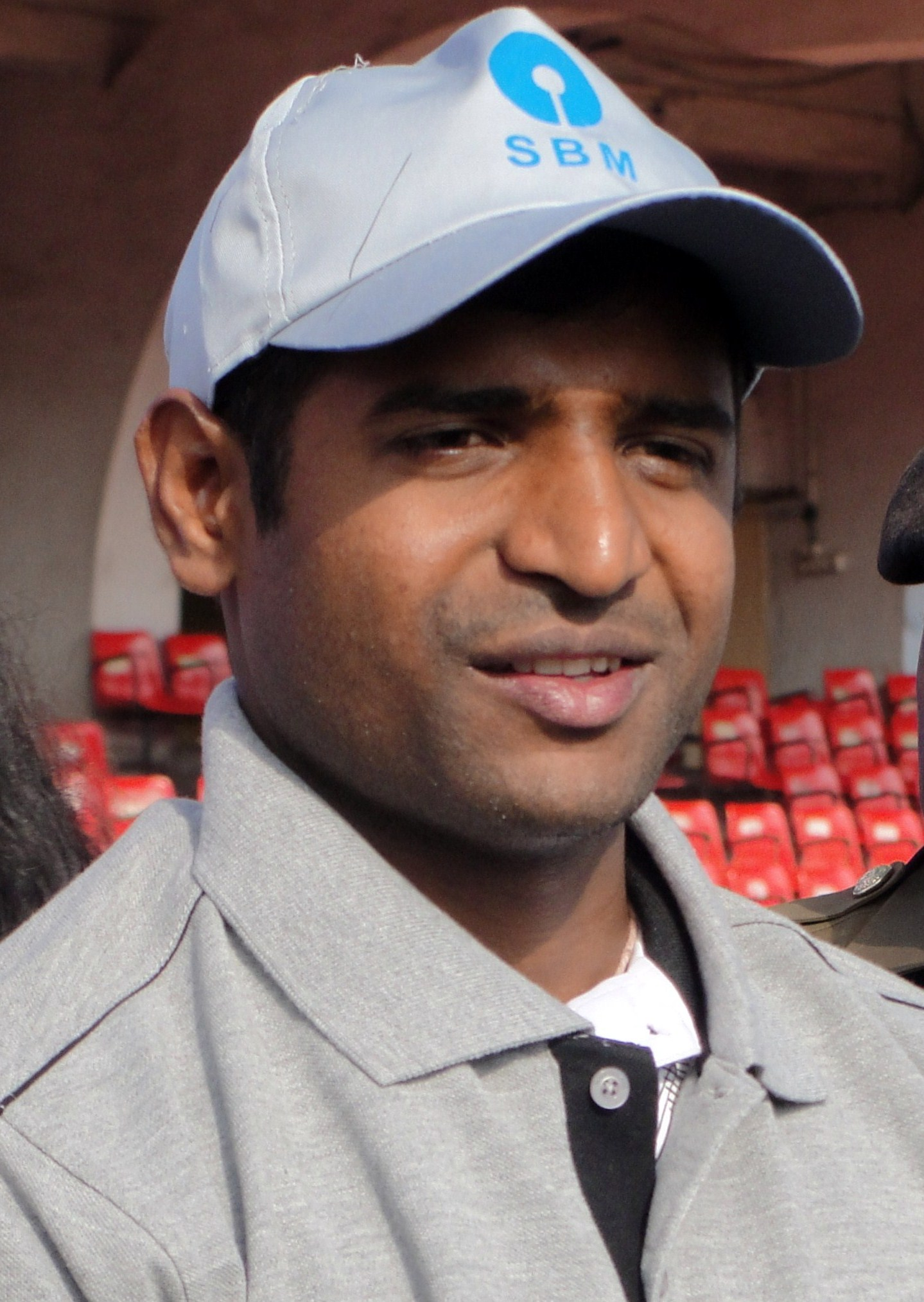
H. N. Girisha

Recipient	Field
Dr. M Ishwar, Hubli	Yoga and Social Services
C. V. Rudraradhya	Yoga
Ramanagowda Shivanagowda Patil	Yoga
H. N. Girisha	Sports
H. S. Raghavendra Rao	Literature
Bolwar Mahammad Kunhi	Literature
Niranjan Walishettar	Literature
Janagere Venkataramaiah	Literature
Chindodi Bangaresh	Theatre
N. S. Murthy	Theatre
Altaf	Theatre
M. K. Sundar Raj	Theatre
Hanumantha Basappa Thimmapur	Music
Mysore Mahadevappa	Music
Nandini Eshwar	Dance
Venkappa Ambaji Sugathekar	Folklore
Yellamma Basappa Madar	Folklore
Nagari Siddaiah	Folklore
Vemagal Narayana Swamy	Folklore
Palandira Devaiah	Folklore
Shivarudrappa Revanasiddappa Mudhol	Folklore
Pundalik Poojari	Folklore
Ramesh Kalladka	Folklore
Sangappa P. Hoogar	Folklore
P. S. Kumar	Fine Arts
K. N. Ramachandran	Fine Arts
Krishnappa Ramappa Badiger	Sculpture
Prakash Gurusiddappa Yaragatti	Sports
Gode Narayana Hegde	Yakshagana
Radhabai Maruthi Madar	Yakshagana
S. D. Ankalagi	Cinema
B. Jaya	Cinema
Bhashyam Swamy	Education
B. K. Hiremath	Education
G. S. Paramashivaiah	Science
Sagar Dugani	Science
R. L. Kashyap	Others
N. G. Keroor	Others
Hiremagalur Kannan	Others
C. V. Kerimani	Others
Sudhakar Chaturvedi	Others
E. V. Satyanarayana	Media
S. K. Sheshachandrika	Media
Gopal Prahladrao Nayak	Media
T. V. Shivanandan	Media
S. Shantaram	Media
Tatyarao Kamble	Social Work
P. S. Benjamin	Social Work
Aravind Seetharam	Social Work
Basavalinga Pattaddevaru	Social Work
Vasanthnarayan Kulkarni	Agriculture
Linganna Kalburgi	Overseas Kannadiga
Puttaswamy Gudigar	Overseas Kannadiga
Umapathi	Overseas Kannadiga
Shankar Kumbi	Environment
H. C. Sharath Chandra	Environment
Shankarappa Ramappa Sankannavar	Institution
Karnataka Blind Welfare Association	Institution
Rangashree Kala Samsthe	Institution
Karnataka Engineers Academy	Institution
Mohan	Institution
Spoorthi Dhaama	Institution
Mogaveera Vyavasthapaka Mandali	Institution
