= Nehru Nagar =

- Neighbourhood
- Location in Karnataka, India Nehru Nagar (India)
- Coordinates: 15.451686°N 74.971977°E
- Country: India
- State: Karnataka
- District: Dharwad

Government
  - Type: Municipal corporation
  - Body: Hubli-Dharwad Municipal Corporation

Population (2011)
  - Total: 21,209

Languages
  - Official: Kannada
- Time zone: UTC+5:30 (IST)
- ISO 3166 code: IN-KA
- Vehicle registration: KA-25

Nehru Nagar is a locality in Dharwad, Karnataka, India. It is surrounded by other localities like Tapovan, Kelgeir, Kelgeri Anjaneya Nagar and Vinayak Nagar. The nearest railway station is Dharwad railway station. The town is also close to Karnatak University and Kelgeri Lake.

== Demographics ==
As of the 2011 Census of India there were 140 households in Nehru Nagar and a total population of 705 consisting of 339 males and 366 females. There were 130 children ages 0-6.
