= RN Shetty Stadium =

Sports stadium in Dharwad, Karnataka, India

Coordinates: 15°27′33″N 75°0′19″E

Dr. RN Shetty Stadium
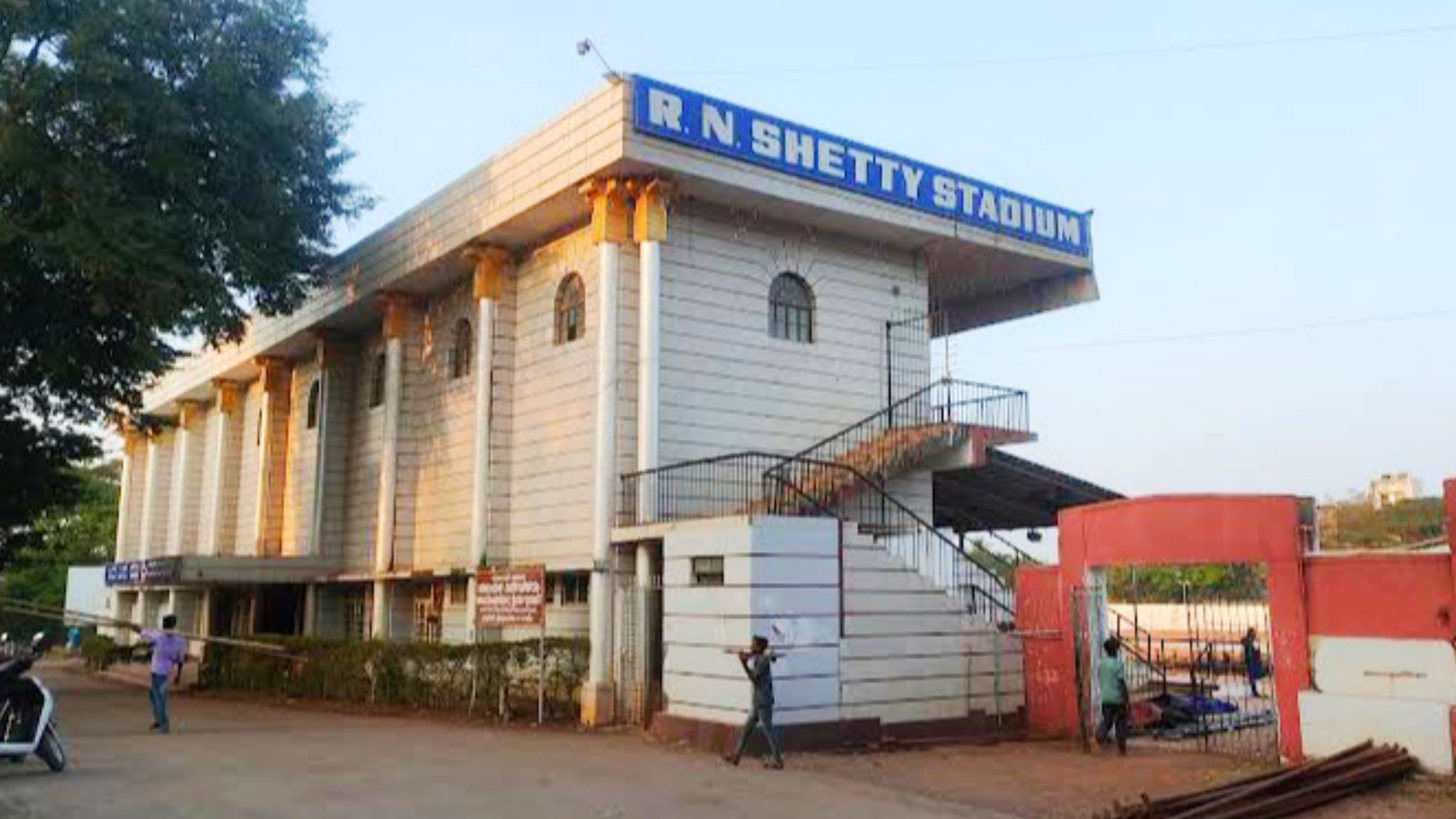
- RN Shetty Stadium admin building
- Interactive map of Dr. RN Shetty Stadium
- Full name: Dr. RN Shetty Stadium
- Address: Jublee Circle, College Rd, Dharwad 580001; Dharwad; India
- Location: Dharwad, India
- Owner: Sports Authority Of Karnataka
- Operator: Sports Authority Of Karnataka
- Capacity: 20,000

Construction
- Groundbreaking: 1949
- Built: 1949
- Opened: 1949
- Renovated: 2012

Website
- www.espncricinfo.com/india/content/ground/58061.html

Dr. RN Shetty Stadium is a multi-purpose stadium in Dharwad, Karnataka, India. Due to its proximity to Jubilee Circle, Karnatak College Dharwar, Karnataka University Dharwad, and St. Joseph's High School - the stadium is popular among various educational institutions of Dharwad and the ground is mainly used for organizing matches of football, field hockey and other sports. The stadium has hosted a Ranji Trophy match in 1990 when Karnataka cricket team played against Hyderabad cricket team. This was only time the stadium hosted a cricket match.

It is the usual venue of Karnataka Rajyotsava and Independence Day celebrations in Dharwad, where students of prominent schools & colleges in Dharwad perform various celebratory activities like singing patriotic songs, dancing, etc.

Renovation work started to build a 400-metre synthetic track in 2012.

R N Shetty Stadium Dharawada
