= Dharwad =

- City
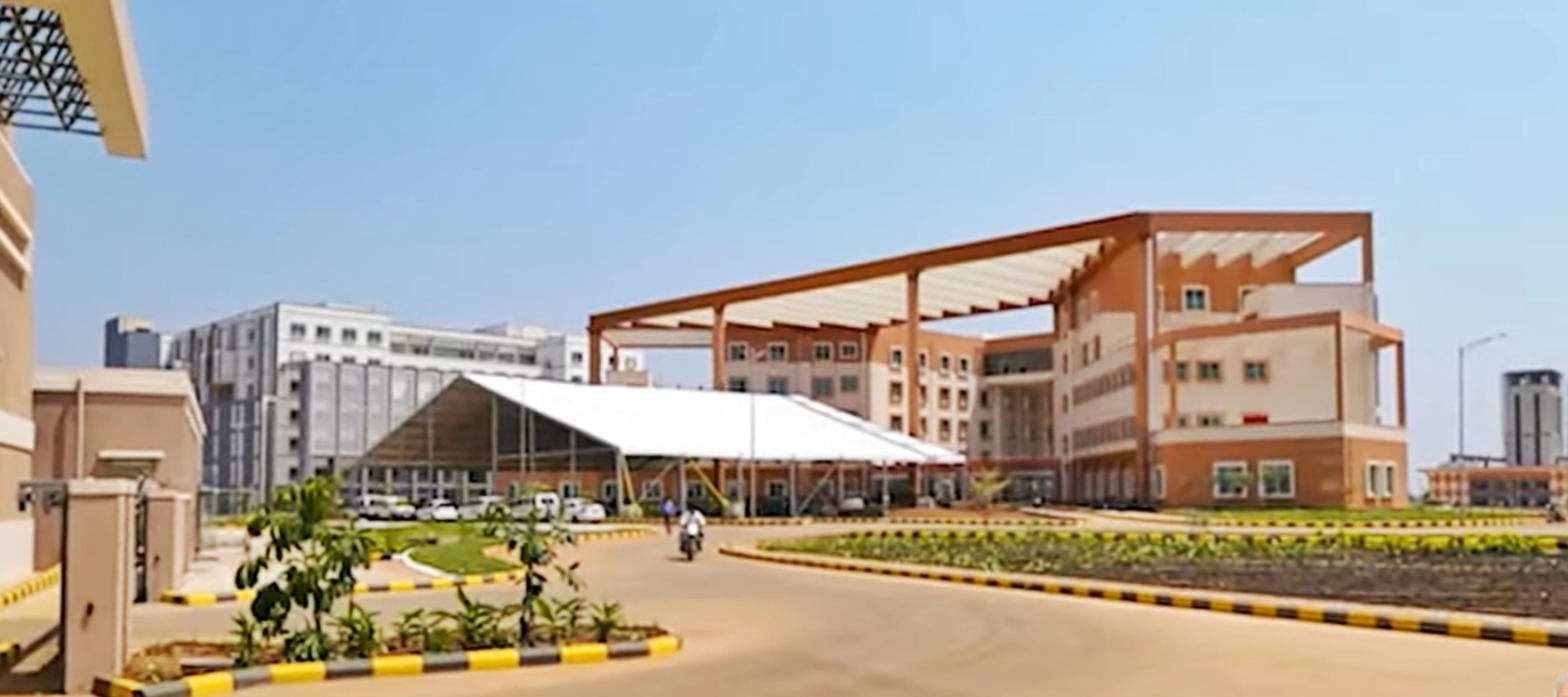
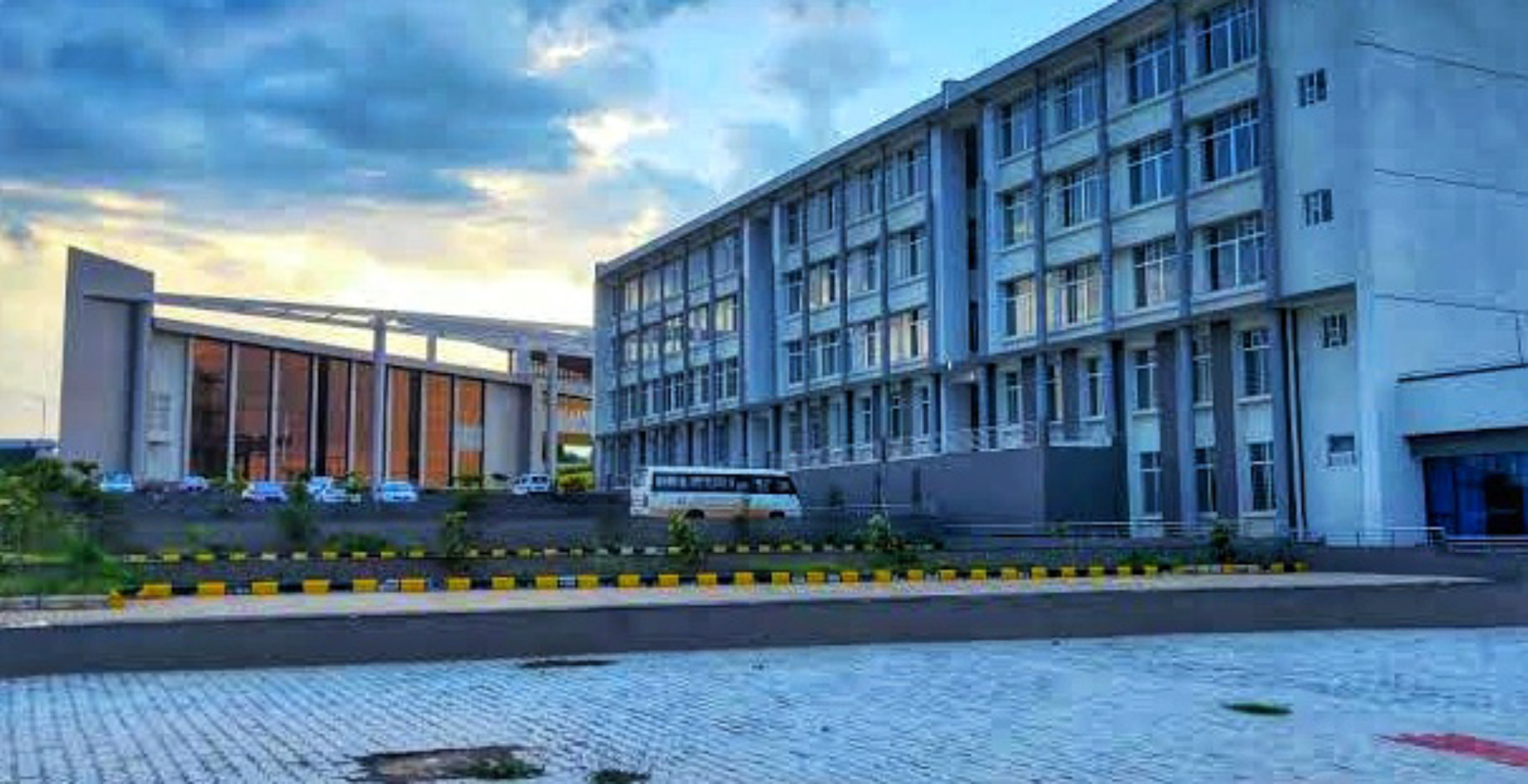
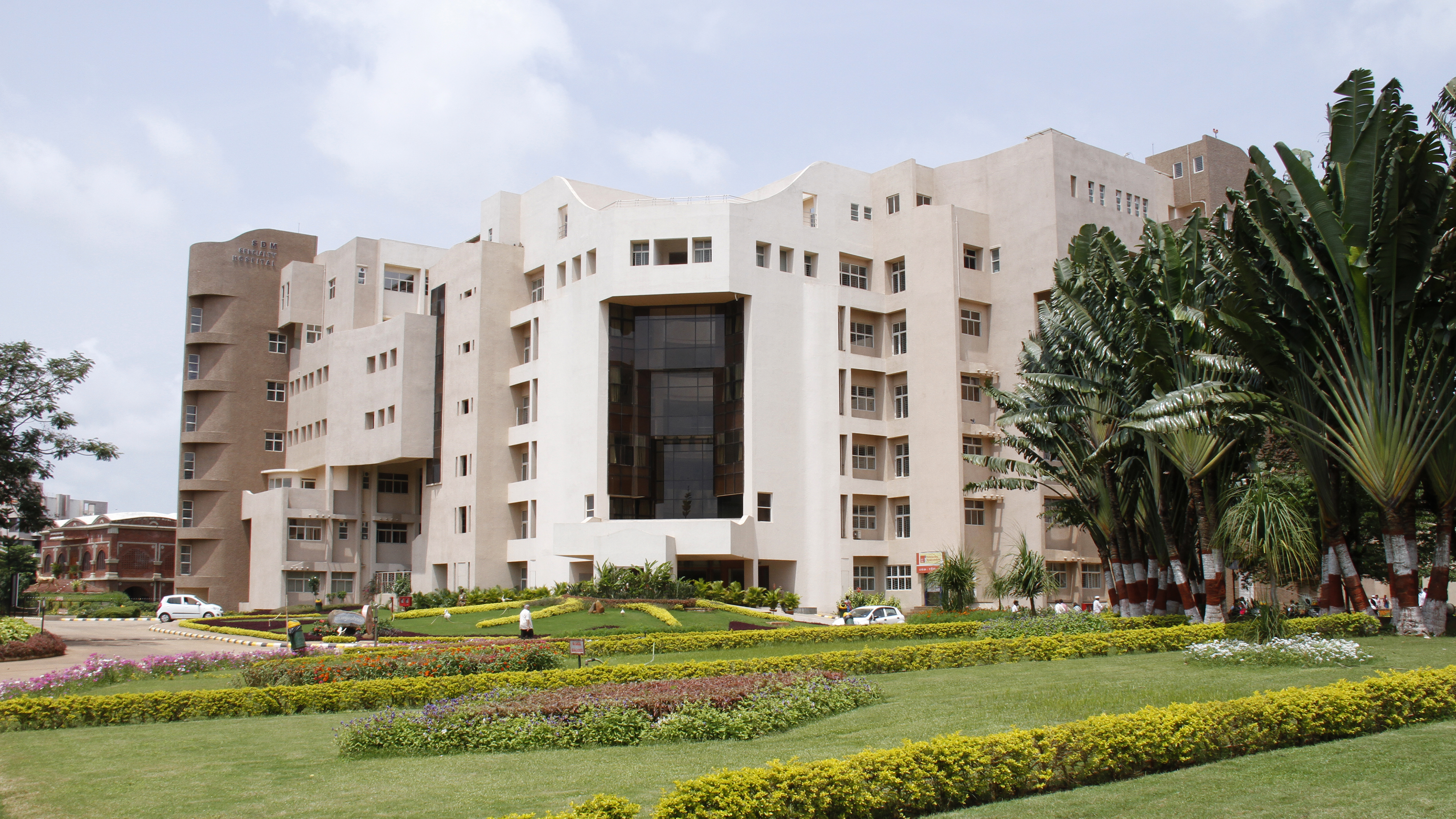
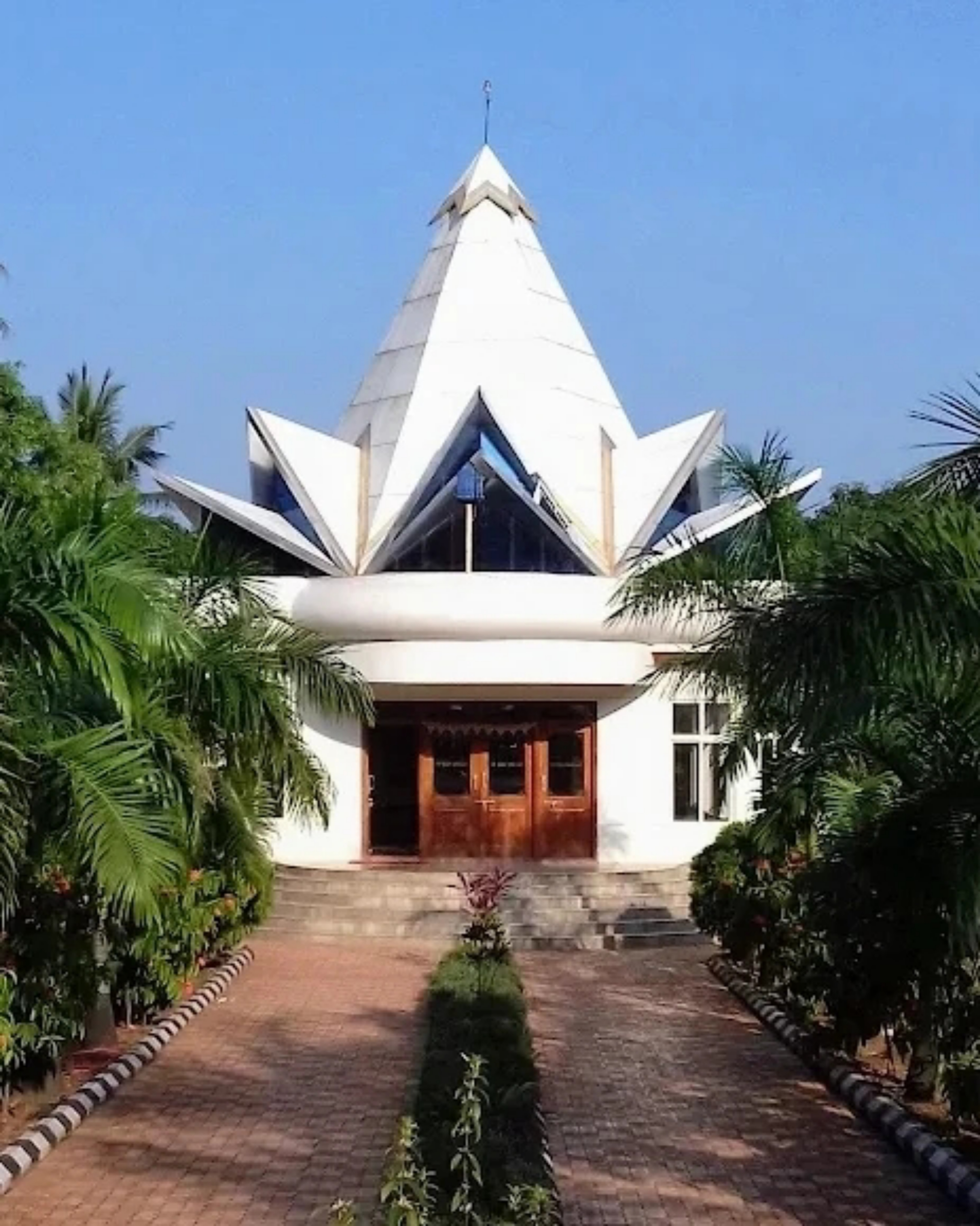
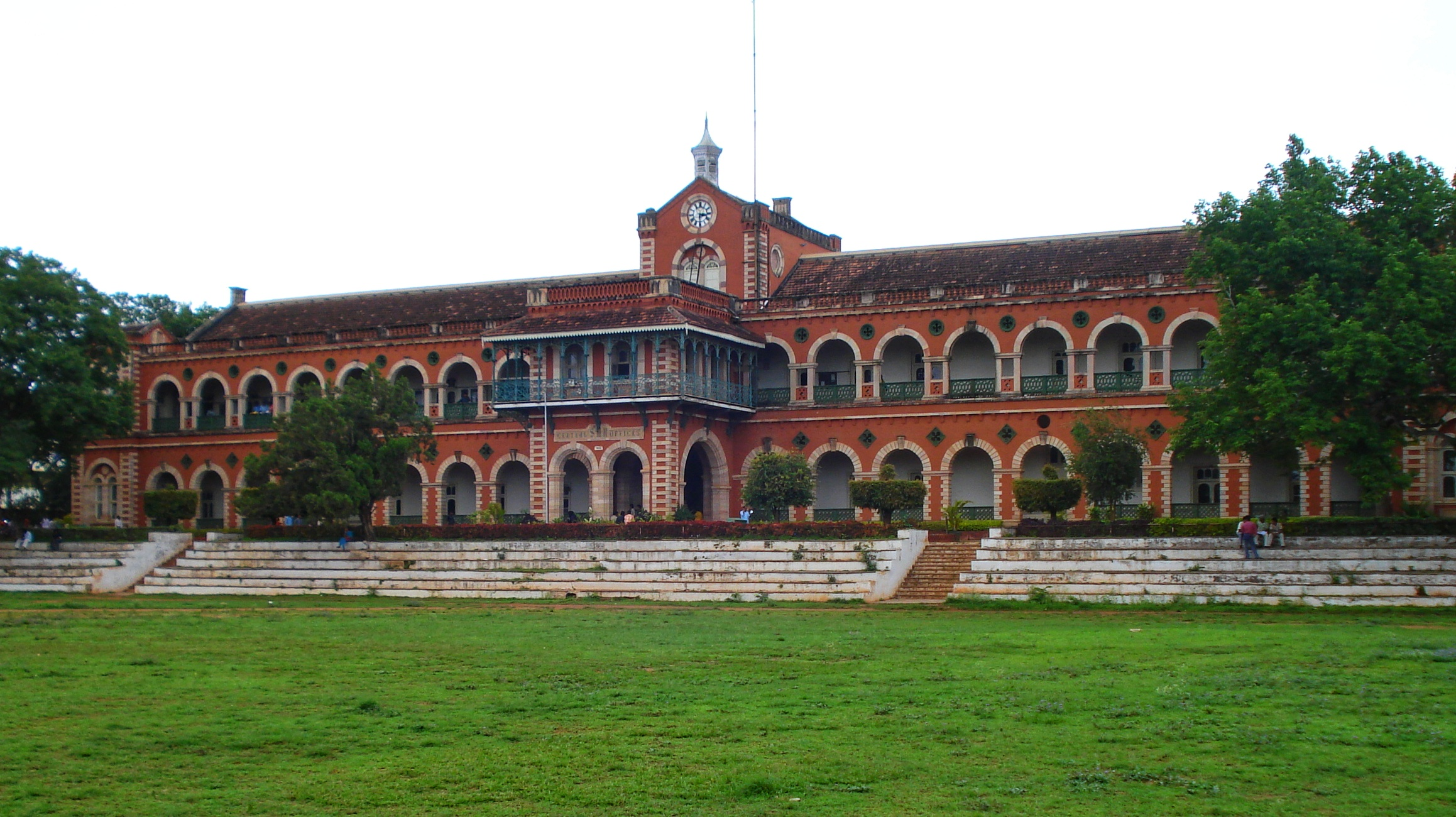
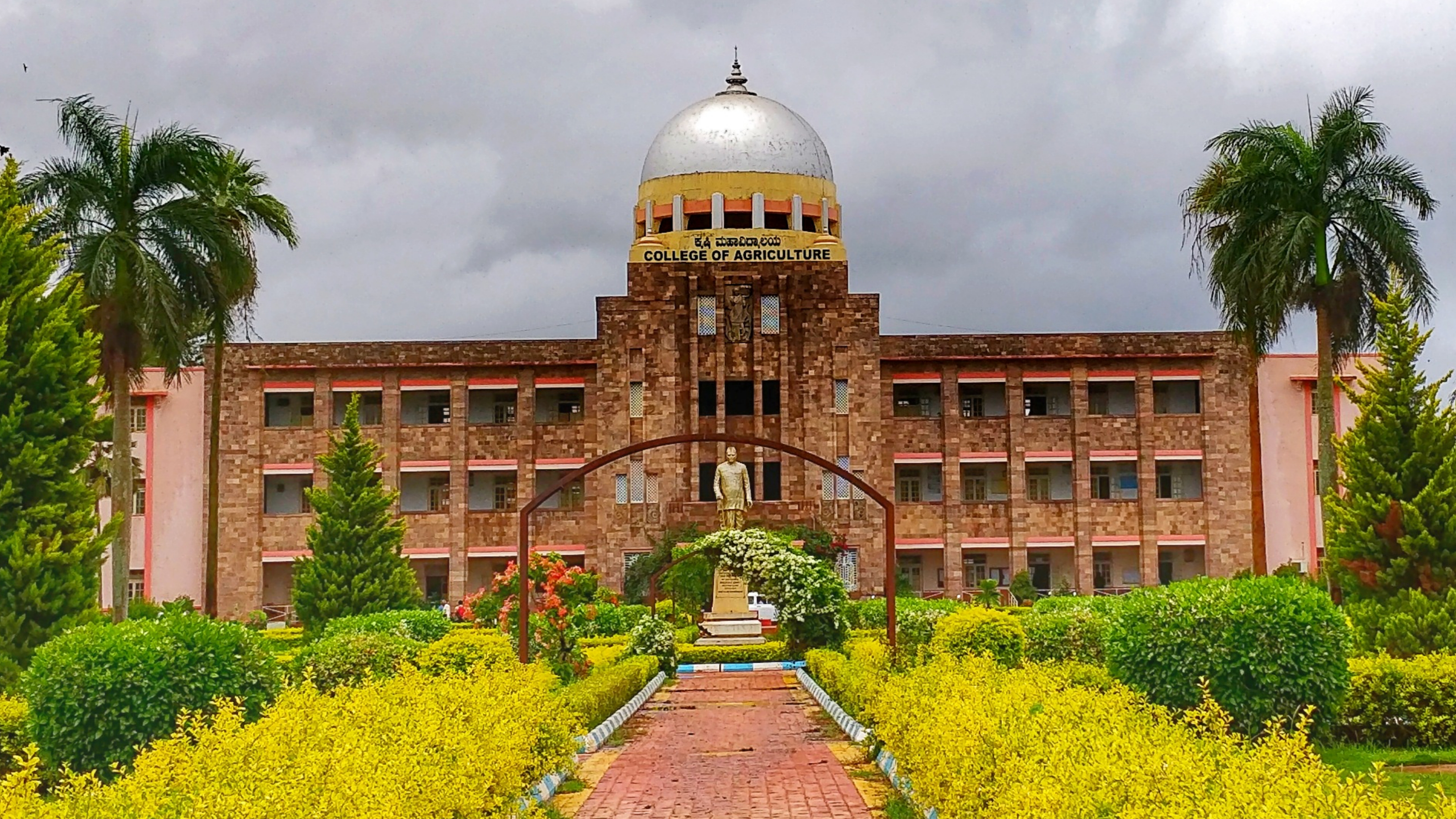
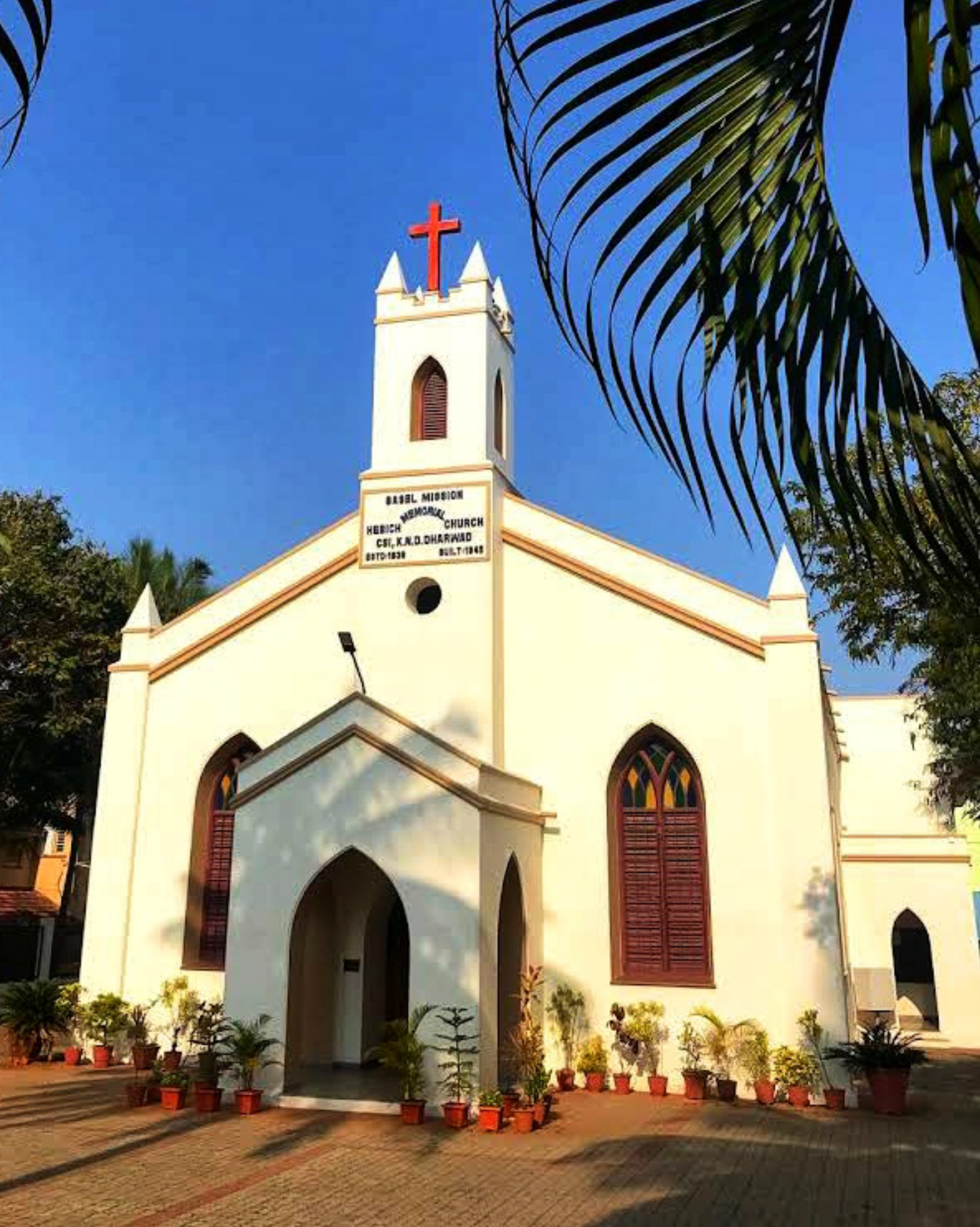
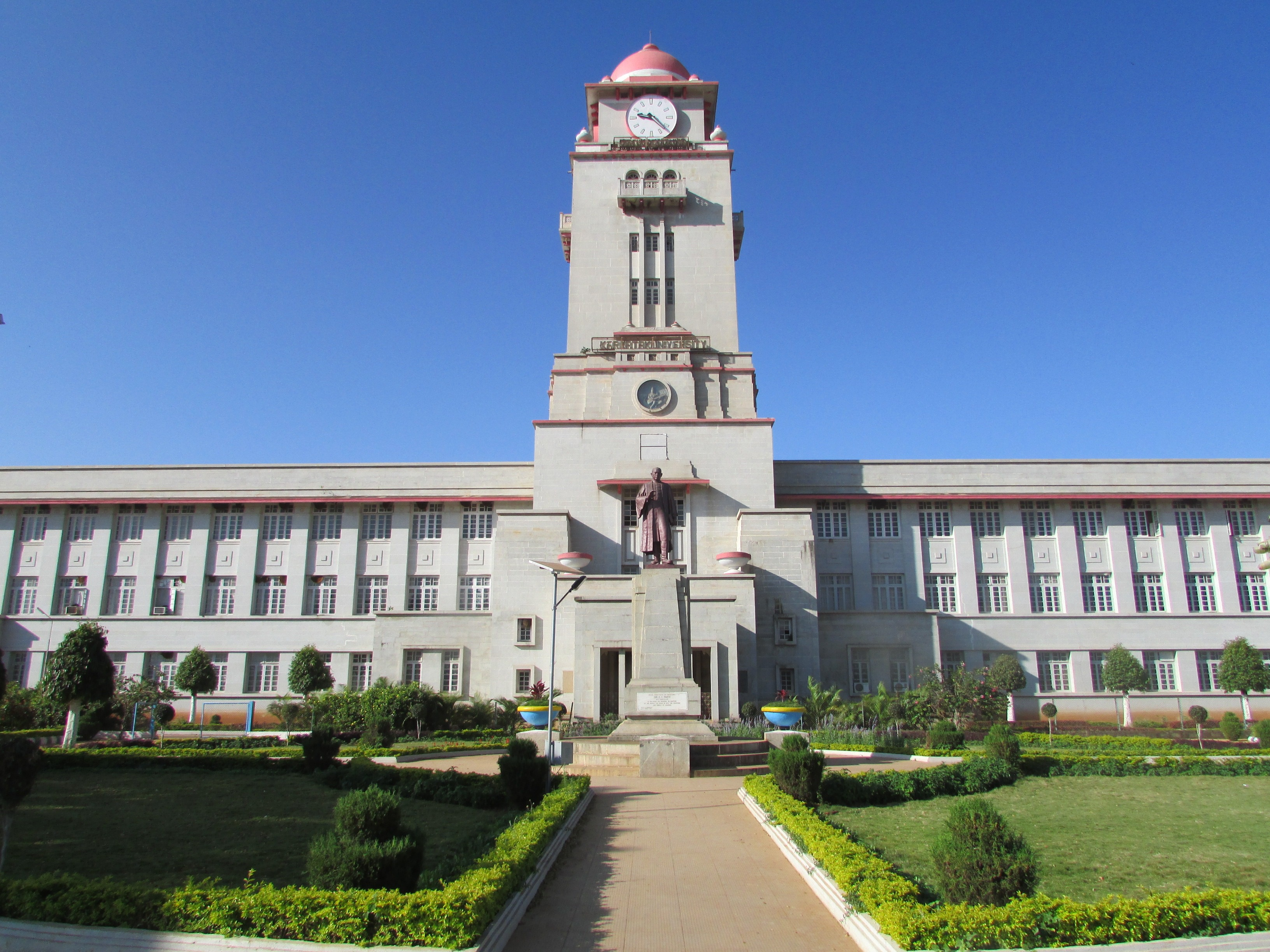
- Indian Institute of Technology Dharwad Indian Institute of Information Technology, Dharwad SDM College of Medical Sciences Kumaraswamiji Tapovan Karnatak College (KCD) University of Agricultural Sciences CSI Hebich Memorial Church Karnatak University
- Nicknames: Pedha Nagari, Hubli-Dharwad City, Dharanagari, Vidya Kashi, Sanskratika nagari, Education Hub of Karnataka, Oxford of Karnataka.
- Interactive map of Dharwad
- Location in Karnataka Dharwad (India) Dharwad (Asia)
- Coordinates: 15°27′30″N 75°00′30″E
- Country: India
- State: Karnataka
- District: Dharwad
- Established: 1403 (623 years ago)
- Founder: Chalukya dynasty

Government
  - Type: Municipal Corporation
  - Body: Hubli-Dharwad Municipal Corporation (1962–2025); Hubballi-Dharwad Urban Development Authority
  - Mayor: Bijwad Durgamma Shashikanth
  - MP: Pralhad Joshi
  - MLA (Hubli Dharwad West): Arvind Bellad
  - MLA (Dharwad): Vacant
  - MLA (Hubli Dharwad East): Abbayya Prasad
  - MLA (Hubli-Dharwad Central): Mahesh Tenginakai

Area
  - City: 462 km^{2} (178 sq mi)
  - Rank: 2nd in Karnataka
- Elevation: 750.0 m (2,460.6 ft)

Population
  - Rank: India : 49; Karnataka : 2
  - Density: 434/km^{2} (1,120/sq mi)
  - Metro: 1,137,000
- Demonym: Dharwadian

Languages
  - Official: Kannada
- Time zone: UTC+5:30 (IST)
- Pincode(s): 580 xxx
- Vehicle registration: KA-25, KA-63
- Planning agency: Hubballi-Dharwad Urban Development Authority
- Airport: Hubli Airport(HBX)
- Rapid Transit: Hubballi-Dharwad Bus Rapid Transit System
- Website: www.dharwad.nic.in

Dharwad (Kannada pronunciation: [d̪ʰäːɾɐʋäːɖɐ]; formerly known as Dharwar) is a city located in the northwestern part of the Indian state of Karnataka. It is the headquarters of the Dharwad district of Karnataka and forms a contiguous urban area with the city of Hubballi. It was merged with Hubballi in 1962 to form the twin cities of Hubballi-Dharwad. It covers an area of 213 km^{2} (82 sq mi) and is located 430 km (270 mi) northwest of Bangalore, on NH-48, between Bangalore and Pune.

In 2016, Hubli-Dharwad was selected for solar city / green city master plans. In 2017, government of India included Hubli-Dharwad city for a smart city project, a flagship scheme for overall development of infrastructure in the twin-cities.

== Etymology ==
The word "Dharwad" is derived from the Sanskrit word 'dwarawata', 'dwara', meaning "door" and 'wata' or 'wada' meaning "town." It means a place of rest in a long travel or a small habitation. For centuries, Dharwad acted as a resting place for travelers and a gateway between the Malenadu (western mountains) and the Bayalu Seeme (plains).

== History ==
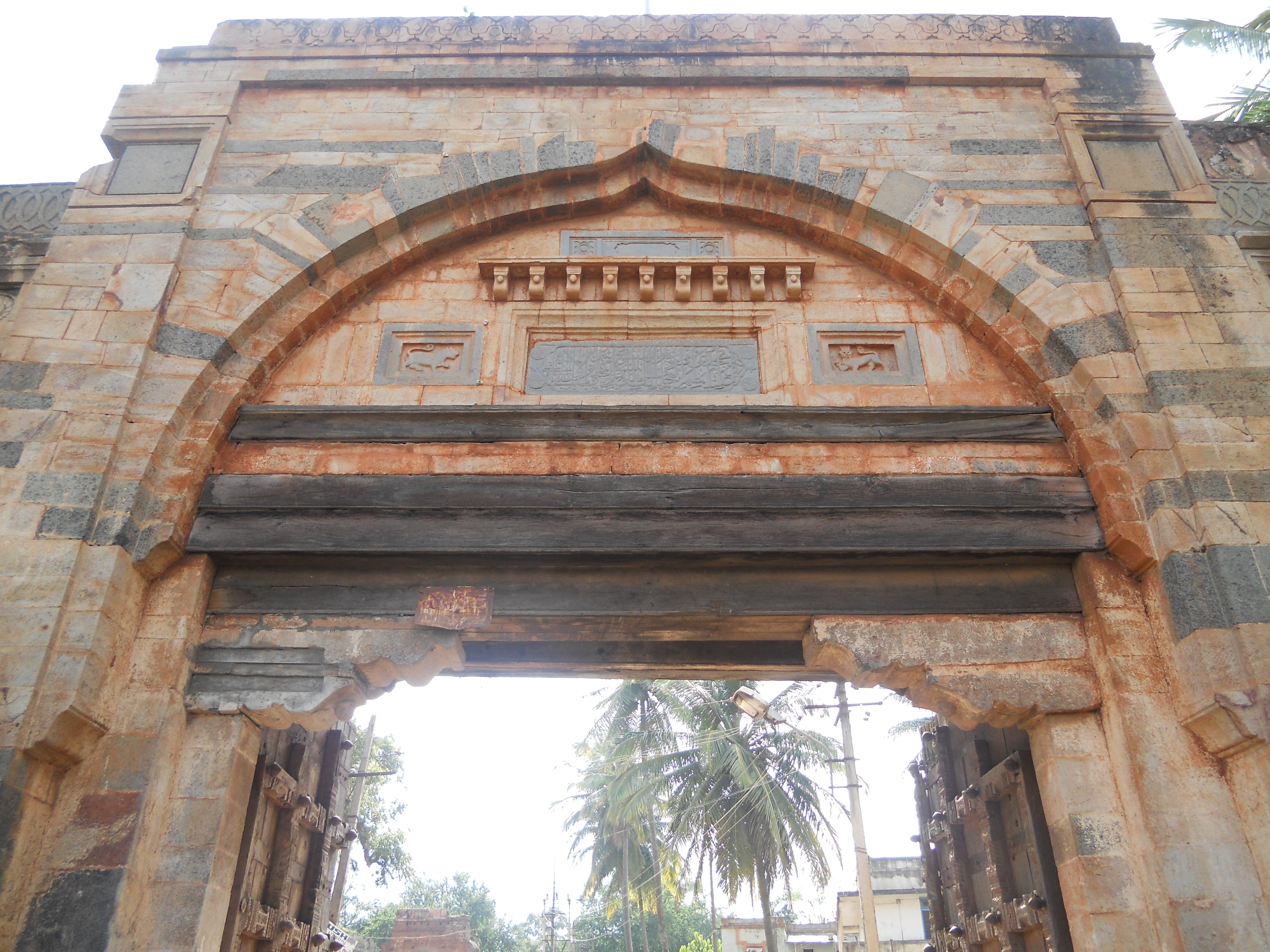
Outer fort gates of Dharwad Fort

British collector St John Thackeray's obelisk at Kittur Chennamma park

The Chalukyas ruled Dharwad during the 12th century. A stone inscription at the Durgadevi temple in the Dharwad Fort area indicates that there was a ruler by the name of BhaskaraDeva in 1117. In the 14th century, the district was first overrun by the Bahmani Sultanate, after which it was annexed to the newly established Hindu kingdom of Vijayanagar, an official of which named "Dharav", according to local tradition, built the fort at Dharwad town in 1403. After the defeat of the king of Vijayanagar in the Battle of Talikota (1565), Dharwad was for a few years practically independent under its Hindu governor; but in 1573 the fort was captured by the sultan of Bijapur, Adil Shah, and Dharwad was annexed to his dominions. Adil Shah built a fort in an area later called Manna Killa, and later Nazratabad. With this fort, the strategic importance of Dharwad increased and it attracted the attention of subsequent conquerors, including Aurangzeb, Chatrapati Shivaji Maharaj, Aurangzeb's son Bahadur Shah I, Peshwa Balaji Baji Rao, Hyder Ali, Tipu Sultan and finally the British colonizers.

In 1685, the fort was taken by the Mughal emperor Aurangzeb, and Dharwad, on the break-up of the Mughal empire, fell under the sway of the Maratha Empire. In 1764, the province was overrun by Hyder Ali of the Kingdom of Mysore, who in 1778 captured the fort of Dharwad. The fort was retaken in 1791 by the Marathas. After the final defeat of the Peshwa by the British in 1818, Dharwar was incorporated into the territory of the British East India Company's Bombay Presidency. During the early 19th century, when the British were expanding their domains, they faced a lot of opposition from local rulers, including Baba Saheb of Nargund and Kittur Chennamma.

== Geography ==
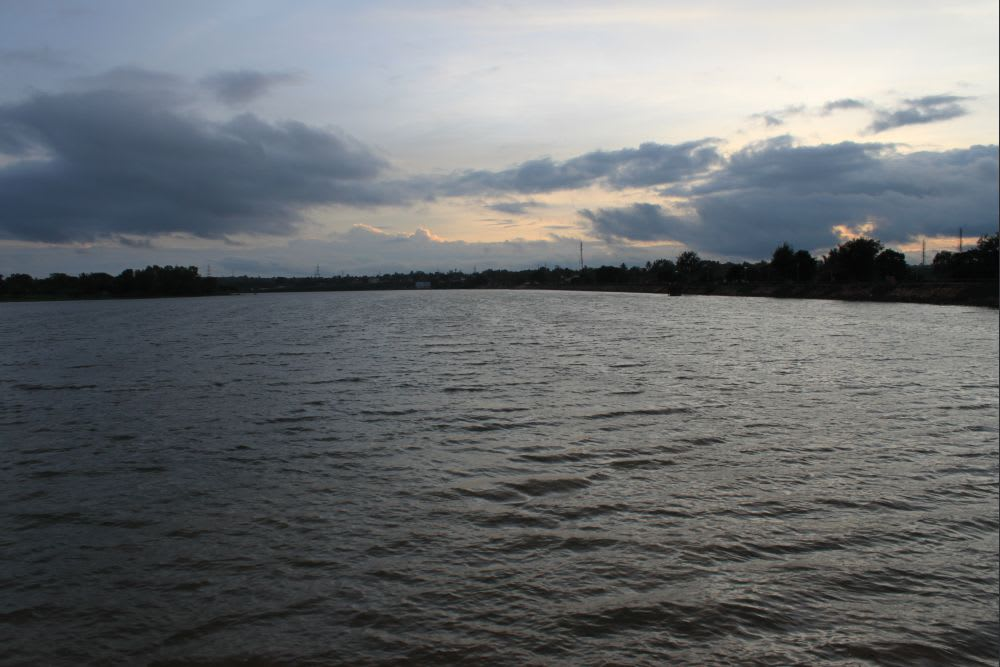
Kelgeri lake is a famous water body located in Kelgeri, Dharwad

=== Climate ===
Hubli-Dharwad has a tropical wet and dry climate. Summers are relatively mild and dry, lasting from late February to early June. They are followed by the monsoon season, with moderate temperatures and a large amount of precipitation. Temperatures are fairly moderate from late October to early February, with virtually no rainfall. Dharwad is 750 meters above sea level. The average yearly rainfall is 838 mm (33.0 in).

Climate data for Dharwad (1991-2020)
| Month | Jan | Feb | Mar | Apr | May | Jun | Jul | Aug | Sep | Oct | Nov | Dec | Year |
|---|---|---|---|---|---|---|---|---|---|---|---|---|---|
| Record high °C (°F) | 33.6 (92.5) | 37.4 (99.3) | 39.2 (102.6) | 40.1 (104.2) | 40.9 (105.6) | 38.4 (101.1) | 32.7 (90.9) | 32.4 (90.3) | 33.4 (92.1) | 34.0 (93.2) | 32.9 (91.2) | 32.9 (91.2) | 40.9 (105.6) |
| Mean daily maximum °C (°F) | 29.8 (85.6) | 32.3 (90.1) | 35.0 (95.0) | 36.4 (97.5) | 35.4 (95.7) | 29.6 (85.3) | 27.1 (80.8) | 27.0 (80.6) | 28.2 (82.8) | 29.8 (85.6) | 29.6 (85.3) | 28.9 (84.0) | 30.7 (87.3) |
| Mean daily minimum °C (°F) | 13.9 (57.0) | 16.1 (61.0) | 19.2 (66.6) | 21.0 (69.8) | 21.6 (70.9) | 21.2 (70.2) | 20.8 (69.4) | 20.4 (68.7) | 20.1 (68.2) | 19.1 (66.4) | 16.5 (61.7) | 14.2 (57.6) | 18.6 (65.5) |
| Record low °C (°F) | 8.5 (47.3) | 11.0 (51.8) | 11.5 (52.7) | 14.9 (58.8) | 17.7 (63.9) | 18.1 (64.6) | 19.0 (66.2) | 18.0 (64.4) | 16.6 (61.9) | 12.5 (54.5) | 9.5 (49.1) | 9.0 (48.2) | 8.5 (47.3) |
| Average rainfall mm (inches) | 0.4 (0.02) | 1.5 (0.06) | 22.5 (0.89) | 40.4 (1.59) | 95.3 (3.75) | 114.6 (4.51) | 158.5 (6.24) | 152.1 (5.99) | 132.1 (5.20) | 121.8 (4.80) | 34.8 (1.37) | 10.0 (0.39) | 883.9 (34.80) |
| Average rainy days | 0.1 | 0.1 | 0.1 | 3.5 | 5.1 | 9.2 | 14.1 | 11.4 | 9.7 | 5.9 | 2.0 | 0.4 | 62.5 |
| Average relative humidity (%) (at 17:30 IST) | 41 | 32 | 28 | 39 | 51 | 74 | 82 | 83 | 80 | 65 | 53 | 48 | 55 |
Source: India Meteorological Department

== Demographics ==
Historical population
| Year | Pop. | ±% |
|---|---|---|
| 1901 | 21,230 | — |
| 1911 | 29,591 | +39.4% |
| 1921 | 34,220 | +15.6% |
| 1931 | 40,904 | +19.5% |
| 1941 | 47,992 | +17.3% |
| 1951 | 66,571 | +38.7% |
| 1961 | 77,163 | +15.9% |
| 2001 | 252,375 | +227.1% |
| 2011 | 275,339 | +9.1% |
Source: Census of India

The population of the twin cities as per provisional figures of Census 2011 is 943,857 and is urban. Hubli-Dharwad's population increased 22.99% between 1981 and 1991, from 527,108 to 648,298, and by 21.2% between 1991 and 2001. The Hubli-Dharwad municipality covers 213 km^{2} (82 sq mi).

== Culture ==
Dharwad has earned the reputation of being called as 'Cultural Capital of Karnataka'. Dharwad Region's Cultural Life blossomed with some of the finest musicians, poets, writers, and thinkers at the beginning 20th century. Hindustani Classical Music is a genre that inspires a possessive devotion among people from the region. Dharwad city is known for Karnatic music, art, culture, musicians, poets, writers and cuisine.

=== Hindustani Classical Music Hub ===
The twin cities of Hubli-Dharwad occupy a unique position in the history of Hindustani classical music, serving as a major cultural crucible where northern and southern musical traditions intersected. Despite being geographically located in South India, the region developed into a premier powerhouse for the North Indian Khayal tradition during the late 19th and 20th centuries, giving rise to an unprecedented density of musical maestros.

==== Historical Context and Geopolitical Alignment ====
The region’s musical evolution was heavily influenced by its location and socio-political history. Situated at the ecotone of the coastal Malnad forests and the Deccan Plateau region, the area was a natural stopover for travelling artists. During the 19th century, musicians from North India regularly halted at Dharwad or nearby Miraj while traveling to seek patronage at the royal court of Mysore. Local connoisseurs would persuade these maestros to extend their stays, introducing various gharanas (musical lineages) to the local populace, thus building a cultural ecosystem for the genres to thrive here.

==== Major Gharanas and Stalwarts ====
Rather than developing a single native style, Dharwad became a thriving hub for multiple established lineages, most notably the Kirana gharana and the Jaipur-Atrauli gharana.

==== Kirana Gharana ====
Ustad Abdul Karim Khan, the doyen of the Kirana Gharana, frequented the Dharwad region and spent significant time teaching students in the area. His legacy was deeply cemented by his premier disciple, Sawai Gandharva (Rambhau Kundgolkar), who hailed from nearby Kundgol. Sawai Gandharva went on to mentor three of the most prominent Hindustani vocalists of the 20th century, all rooted in the Hubli-Dharwad region:

- Bhimsen Joshi (born in Gadag): A legendary exponent of the Kirana style and a recipient of India's highest civilian award, the Bharat Ratna.
- Gangubai Hangal (born in Dharwad): A seminal Khayal vocalist who broke gender barriers in classical music, operating from her residence in Hubli.
- Basavaraj Rajguru (born in Yaliwal): An eminent classical vocalist celebrated for his vast repertoire spanning multiple gharana techniques.

==== Jaipur-Atrauli Gharana ====
The Jaipur-Atrauli gharana gained a massive footprint in Dharwad through Mallikarjun Mansur, who was born in Mansur village near Dharwad. Mansur trained under Gwalior-style masters before studying extensively under Ustad Manji Khan and Ustad Bhurji Khan of the Jaipur-Atrauli lineage. Known for his mastery over complex and rare ragas (achhop ragas), Mansur resided in Dharwad throughout his life.

=== Literature ===
Dharwad has nurtured many notable writers in Kannada, and has many locations that bear an association with the Language and State's Culture. Karnataka Vidyavardhaka Sangha also played a role in bringing literary enthusiasts together.

Dharwad has the reputation of earning 3 (out of 8) Jnanpith Awardees in Karnataka. Da Ra Bendre, V.K. Gokak, Girish Karnad.

- Dattatreya Ramachandra Bendre popularly known as Da Ra Bendre is generally considered as one of the greatest Kannada lyric poets of the 20th century. Da Ra Bendre wrote with the pen name ‘Ambikatanayadatta’. Da Ra Bendre described Sadhankeri as a place of inspiration for his poems praising the beauty of nature. He was honored with the Padma Shri award in 1968 and his collection of poems ‘Naaku Tanti’ earned him the Jnanapeeta Award.
- Vinayaka Krishna Gokak (VK Gokak) was a major writer in the Kannada language and a scholar of English and Kannada Literature. His epic ‘Bharatha Sindhu Rashmi’ has earned him Jnanapeeta Award in 1990. He completed his education at Majid High School, Savanur, and attended the Karnataka College, Dharwad where he studied literature.
- Girish Karnad was an Indian Actor, Film Director, and Kannada writer. He was awarded the Jnanapeeta Award for his immense contributions to Kannada Literature and Theatre in 1998. Girish Karnad had earned a Bachelor of Arts (B.A) degree in Mathematics and Statistics from Karnatak Arts College, Dharwad (affiliated to Karnataka University).

=== Fine ats ===
D V Halbhavi established Halbhavi School of Art, Dharwad which was Karnataka's first school of arts in the year 1935. The school, which was founded under the aegis of the Dharwad Fine Art Society, has provided art education to thousands of students. The school also introduces students to complementary fields such as theatre, literature, and music. Kumareshwara Fine Arts College (1991) was founded by K.N. Neglurumatha at Haveri. V.R. Sutar started Gangambika Memorial Art School (1993) at Dharwad. Apart from this in 1966, Dandavathi Math in Dharwad opened an Arts School for mentally challenged children.

Central Government has decided to set up Lalitha Kala Akademy Regional Centre in Dharwad.

=== Cuisine ===
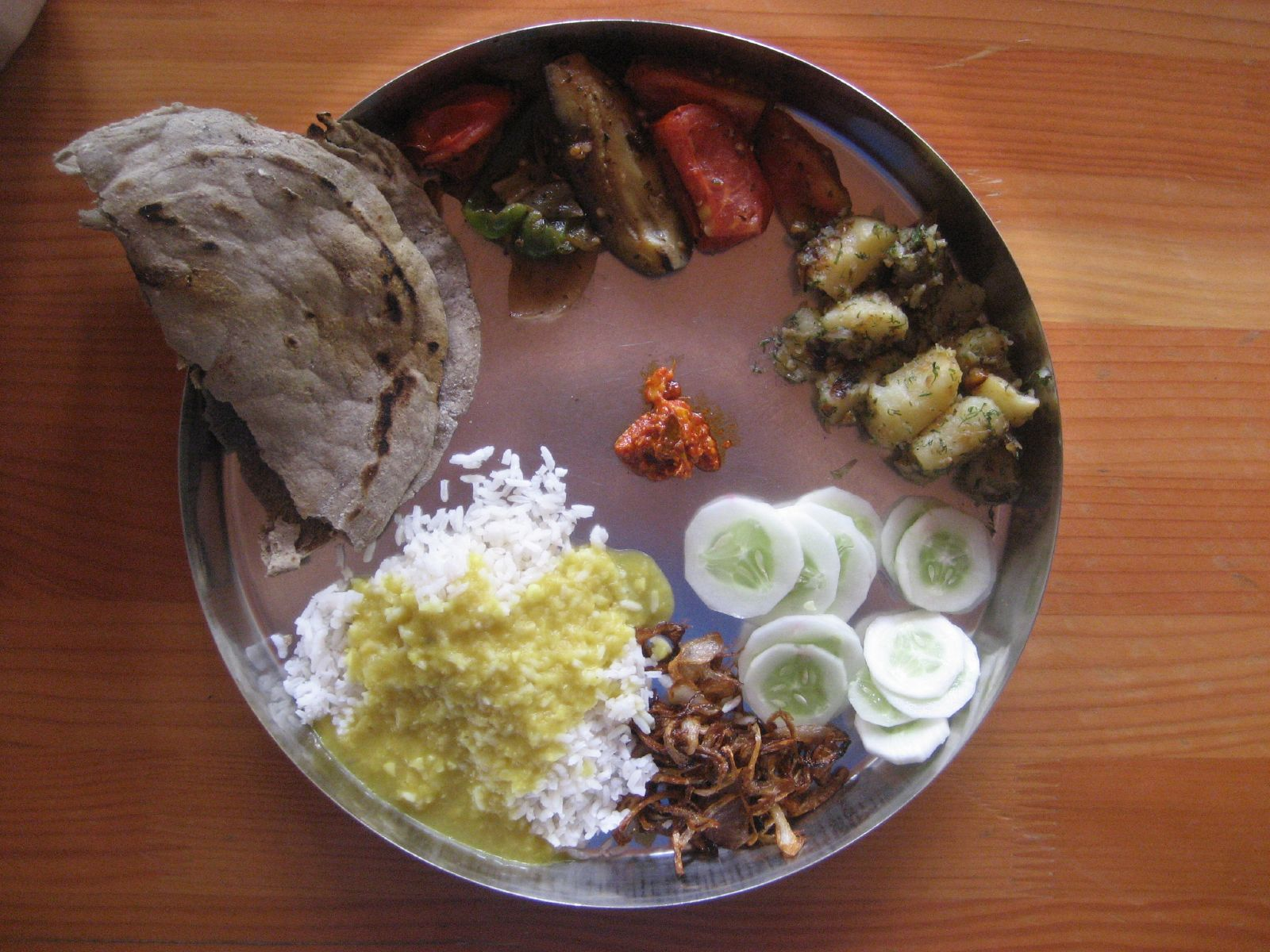
Jolada rotti

Jolada rotti is a very popular and very common diet in Dharwad city it is part of the staple diet of most of the districts of North Karnataka, where it is eaten with pulse curries such as jhunka, yengai, shenga chutney or other assorted chutnies. Jowar rotti is also called as jawarichi bhakri in neighbouring Maharastra.

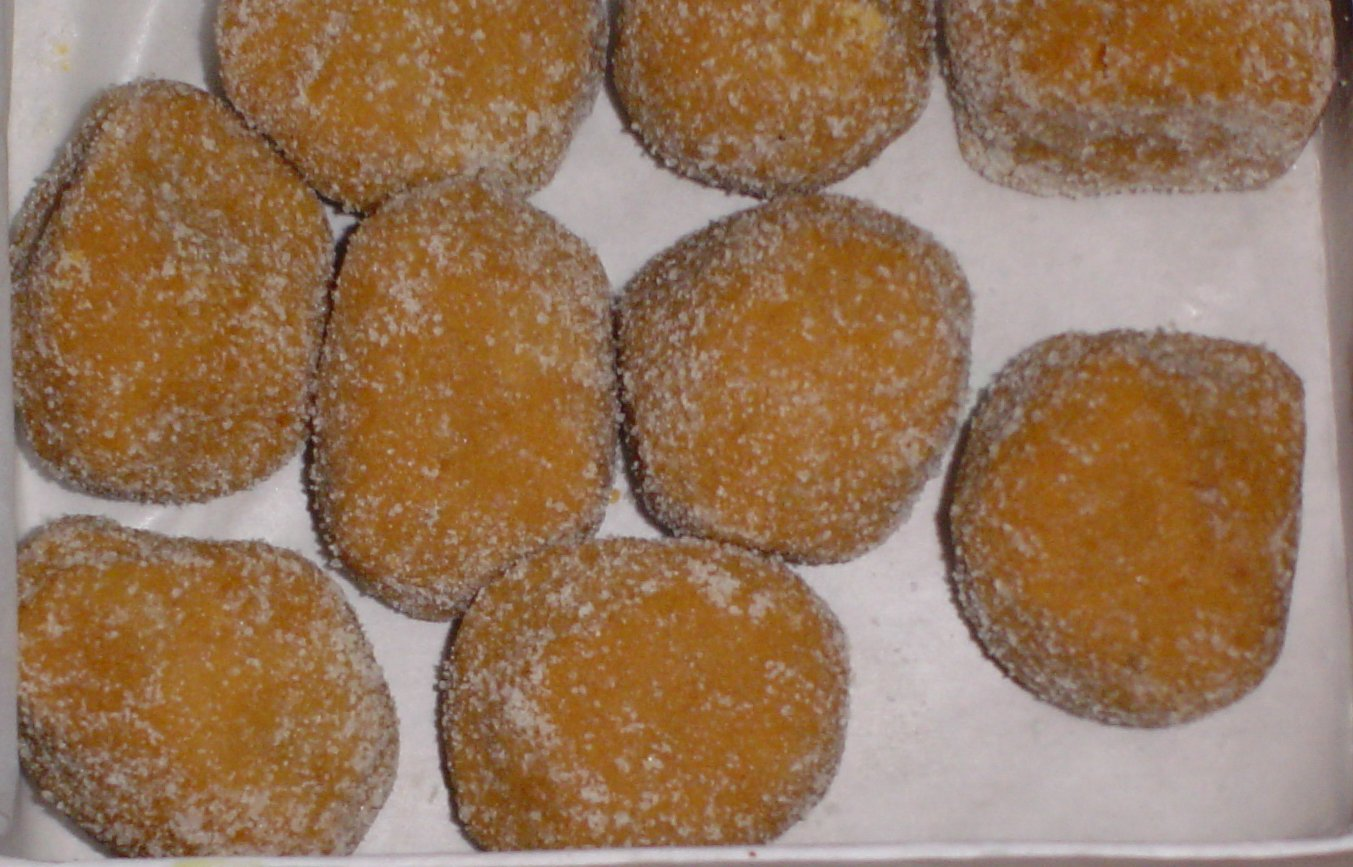
Dharwad peda

Dharwad peda is a sweet delicacy prepared of milk and sugar which has been accorded Geographical Indication.

== Hubli-Dharwad Municipal Corporation ==
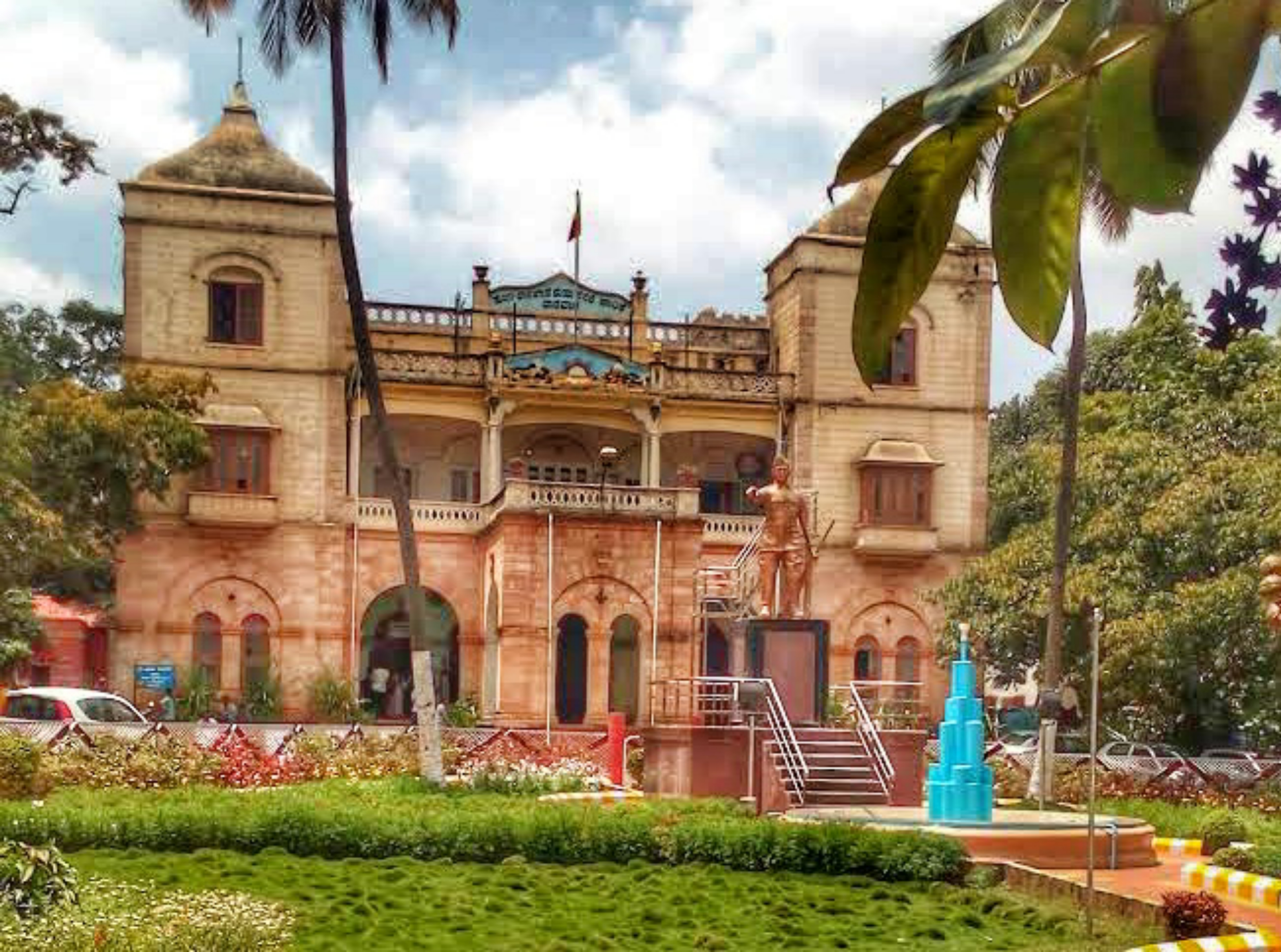
HDMC office at Dharwad

Hubli-Dharwad Municipal Corporation (HDMC) was constituted in 1962 by combining the two cities separated by a distance of 20 kilometres. The area covered by the corporation is spread over 45 revenue villages and is the second-largest city corporation in Karnataka state. The population of the city as per the 1991 census was 700,000. The population of Hubli-Dharwad is 1,158,000 (2020). Hubli Municipal Council was established under the Government of India, and the Dharwad Municipal Council first came into existence on 1 January 1856. Both were merged later forming Hubli-Dharwad Municipal Corporation (HDMC) The headquarters of HDMC is situated in Hubballi, comprising 82 members covering four Vidhan Sabha Constituencies of Hubli-Dharwad. There has been a huge demand by the people of Dharwad to create a separate civic body and get itself detached by HDMC. Claims are that most of the funds are allocated to Hubli solely.

On 2 January 2025, the Karnataka state cabinet declared the separation of Hubballi Dharwad municipal corporation, formation of new municipal corporation for the city of Dharwad.

== Transport ==
=== Road ===
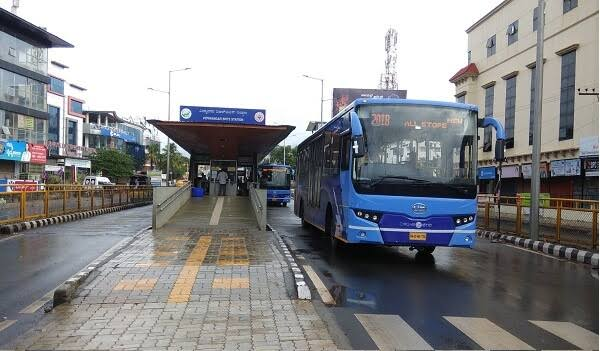
Hubli-Dharwad Bus Rapid Transit System (HDBRTS, Chigari bus)

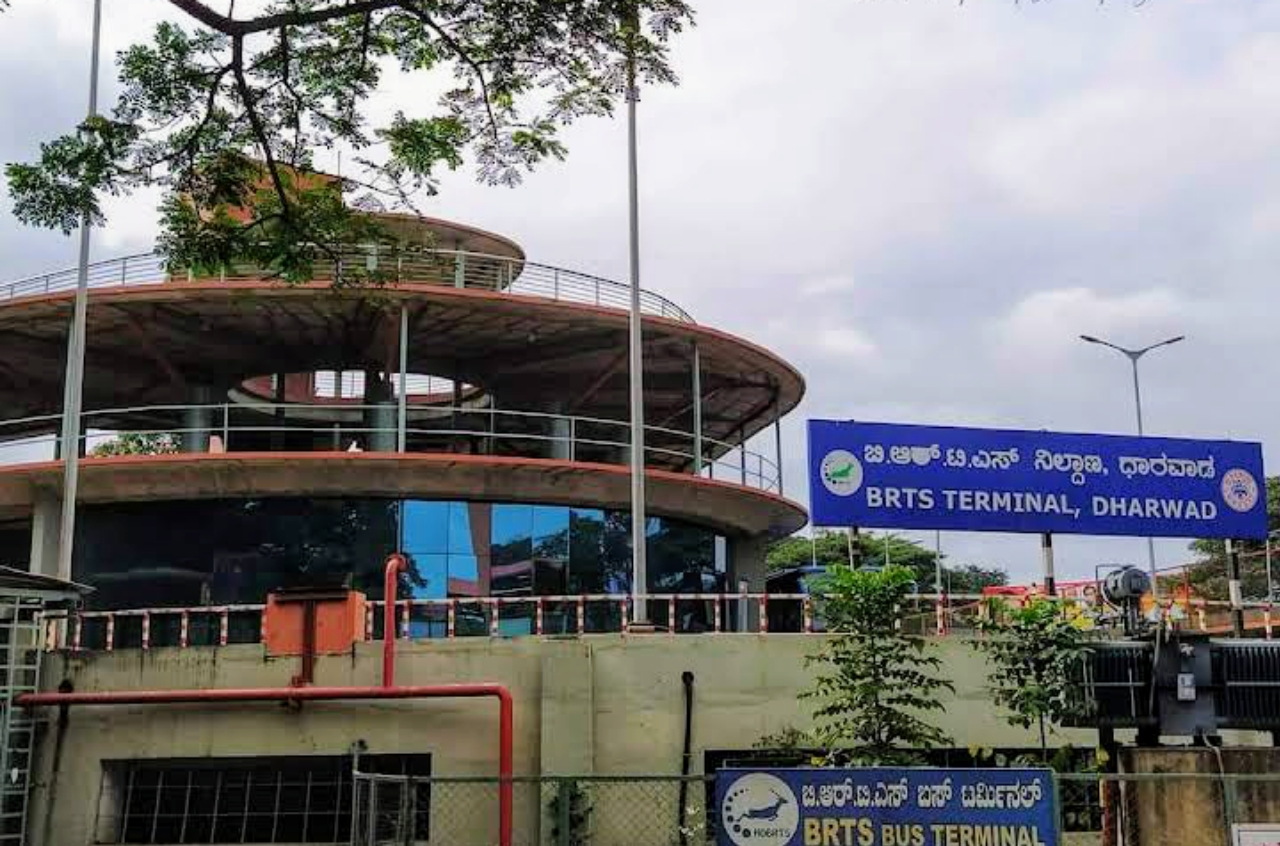
HDBRTS Terminal at Dharwad

Hubballi-Dharwad BRTS (also known as HDBRTS) is a bus rapid transit system built to serve the twin cities of Hubli and Dharwad, located in the North-Western part of Karnataka state in India. Hubli-Dharwad BRTS (HDBRTS) project is a Government of Karnataka initiative to foster long-term economic growth in the region. The project promotes fast, safe, comfortable, convenient and affordable public transportation between the twin cities and aims to reduce congestion and air pollution in the region. But it has severely affected the private traffic, by restricting the lanes. Many don't approve the project, as BRTS system has failed in many cities across India, for example both in Pune and Delhi.

The length of the Hubli-Dharwad BRTS corridor is 22.25 km (13.83 mi) from CBT Hubli to CBT–Dharwad with the width of the cross-sections ranging from 44 to 35 m (144 to 115 ft). The BRTS corridor includes segregated bus lanes, access-controlled bus stations, physical and fare integration with BRT feeder services, off-board ticketing through smart cards and bar-coded paper tickets, an intelligent transport system and high-quality buses (Standard AC buses). The corridor is designed for operating regular and express services. It consists of two lanes for BRTS buses on either side of the median bus station facilitating overtaking lanes for express services. Foot overbridges at six locations, PELICAN signals, and synchronised signal management are proposed to facilitate the easy approach of passengers to bus stations.

=== Air ===
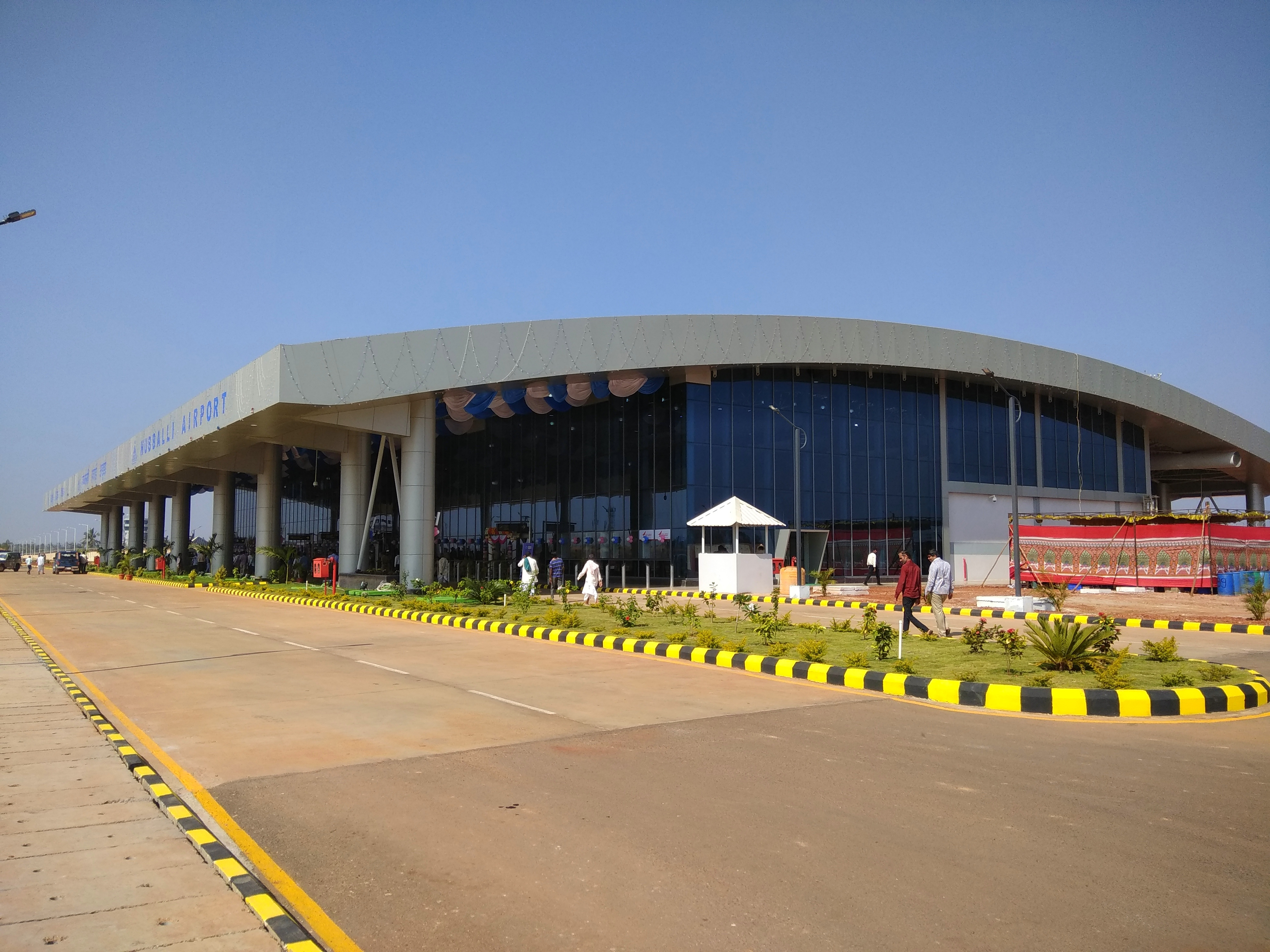
Hubli Airport

Hubli Airport (IATA: HBX, ICAO: VOHB) is the nearest airport that serves the twin cities of Hubli-Dharwad and North Karnataka in the state of Karnataka, India. It is situated on Gokul Road, 8 kilometres from the city centre and 20 kilometres (12 mi) from Dharwad. It is the third busiest airport in Karnataka and the 45th busiest airport in India. In March 2020, Hubli Airport received an award for the best airport under the government of India's Regional connectivity scheme. Hubli airport connects to 10 destinations throughout the country. Efforts are being made to make Hubli Airport as international Airport.

== Media ==
Mangaluru Samachar was the first ever Kannada language newspaper distributed in Dharwad, along with region of North Canara.

In current times the newspapers include Vijaya Karnataka, Vijayavani, Kannada Prabha, Prajavani and Samyukta Karnataka, in Kannada; The Hindu, Times of India, Deccan Herald and The Indian Express in English.

== Sports ==
Cricket and football are the most popular sports in Dharwad and are often played on grounds and on the streets of the city.

=== Cricket ===
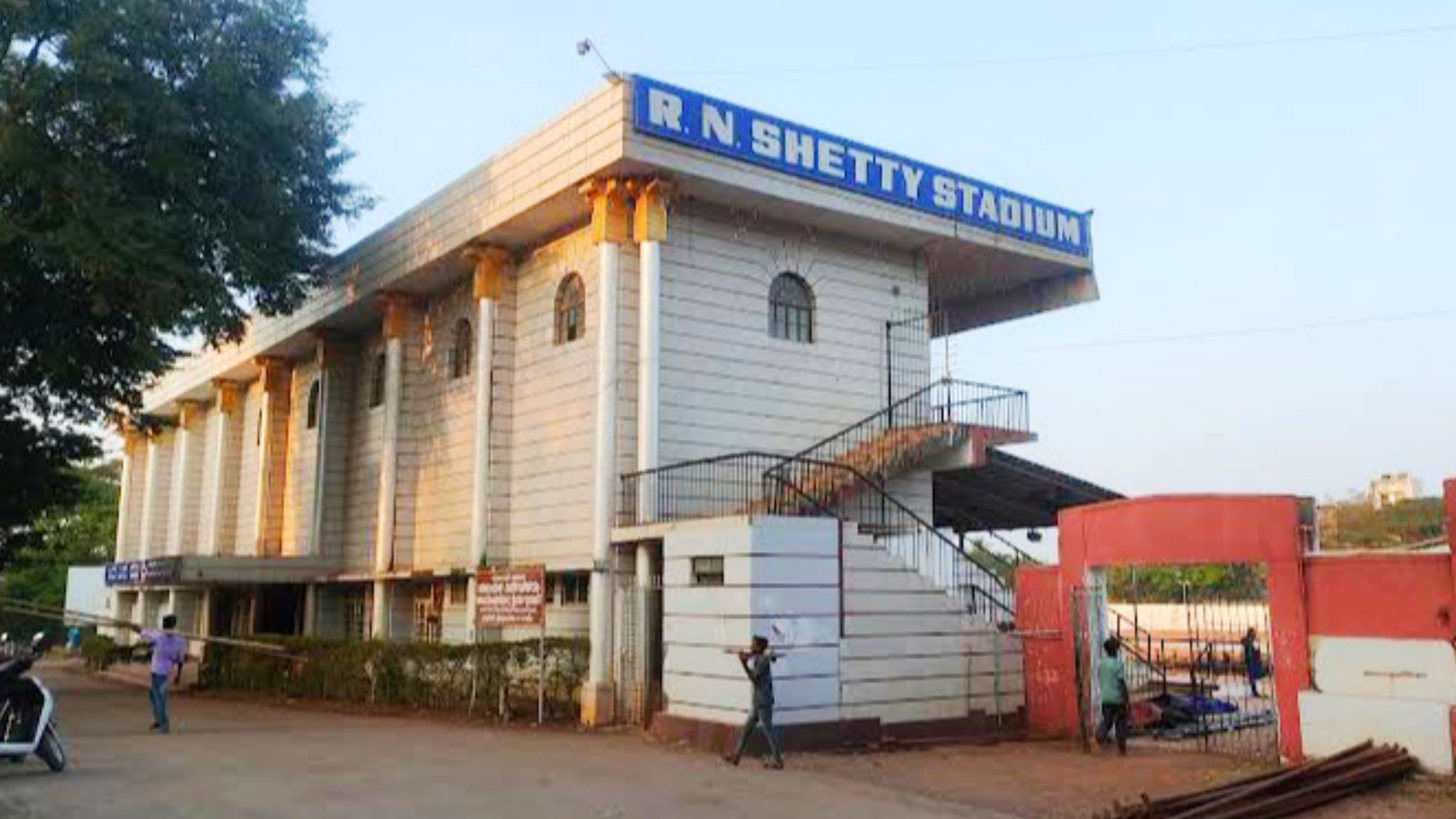
RN Shetty Stadium is a multipurpose stadium on college road

Karnataka State Cricket Association (ASCA) has organised a few professional district-level and state-level cricket matches in Kittur Rani Chennamma cricket stadium, KCD and SDM cricket ground, Sattur.

RN Shetty Stadium stadium has hosted a Ranji Trophy match in 1990 when Karnataka cricket team played against Hyderabad cricket team.

=== Kabaddi ===
Major kabaddi matches are usually held at the Karnatak college ground.

=== Tennis ===
Tennis has been a popular choice among millennials in the city. In 2003 and 2006 Dharwad hosted the International men's tennis tournament ATP Challenger Series.

== Notable people ==
- G. S. Amur
- D. R. Bendre
- Raju Bhatkal
- Nitin Bhille
- Leena Chandavarkar
- Sanjeev Chimmalgi
- Pravin Godkhindi
- Madhav Gudi
- Phakirappa Gurubasappa Halakatti
- Gangubai Hangal
- Suresh Heblikar
- C. N. S. Iyengar
- Pralhad Joshi
- Chennaveera Kanavi
- Sangeetha Katti
- Shankar Kumbi
- Mallikarjun Mansur
- Rajshekhar Mansur
- D. C. Pavate
- Patil Puttappa
- Basavaraj Rajguru

== Civic administration ==
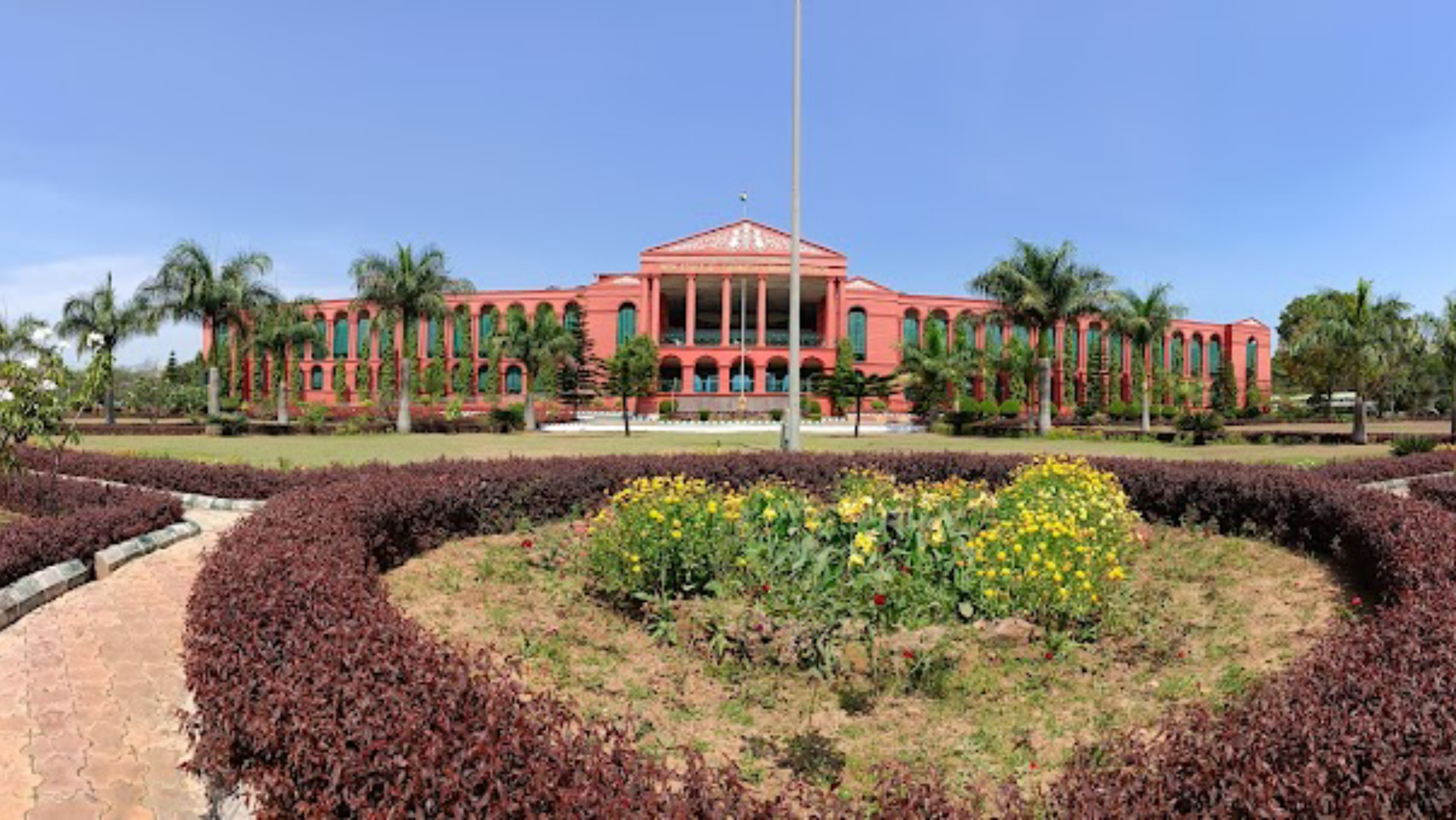
The Karnataka High Court has its bench in Dharwad

Hubli-Dharwad Municipal Corporation (HDMC) was constituted in 1962 by combining two cities separated by a distance of 20 kilometers. The area covered by the corporation is 213 km^{2} (82 sq mi), spread over 45 revenue villages. The population of the city as per the 1991 census was 7 lakhs. The population of Hubli-Dharwad is 943,857 according to 2011 Census. There has been a huge demand by people of Dharwad to create a separate civic body and get itself detached by HDMC. Claims are that most of the funds are allocated to Hubli solely.

- Hubli: Under the Government of India Act of 1850, the Hubli-Municipal council was established on 15 August 1855.
- Dharwad: The Dharwad Municipal Council first came into existence on 1 January 1856. The first non-official President of the council was S.K. Rodda in 1907, and Shri S.V. Mensinkai, was nominated in the following year. But the credit of being the first elected president goes to Shri S.G. Karigudari, who took office in 1920.

Hubli is well known as a commercial as well as an industrial centre, whereas Dharwad is the seat of learning. Popularly believed that, it is this diversity and geographical positions that the state government amalgamated the two cities. The twin-city corporation occupies unique place in Karnataka State. After the capital city of Bangalore, this is the largest city Corporation in the State.

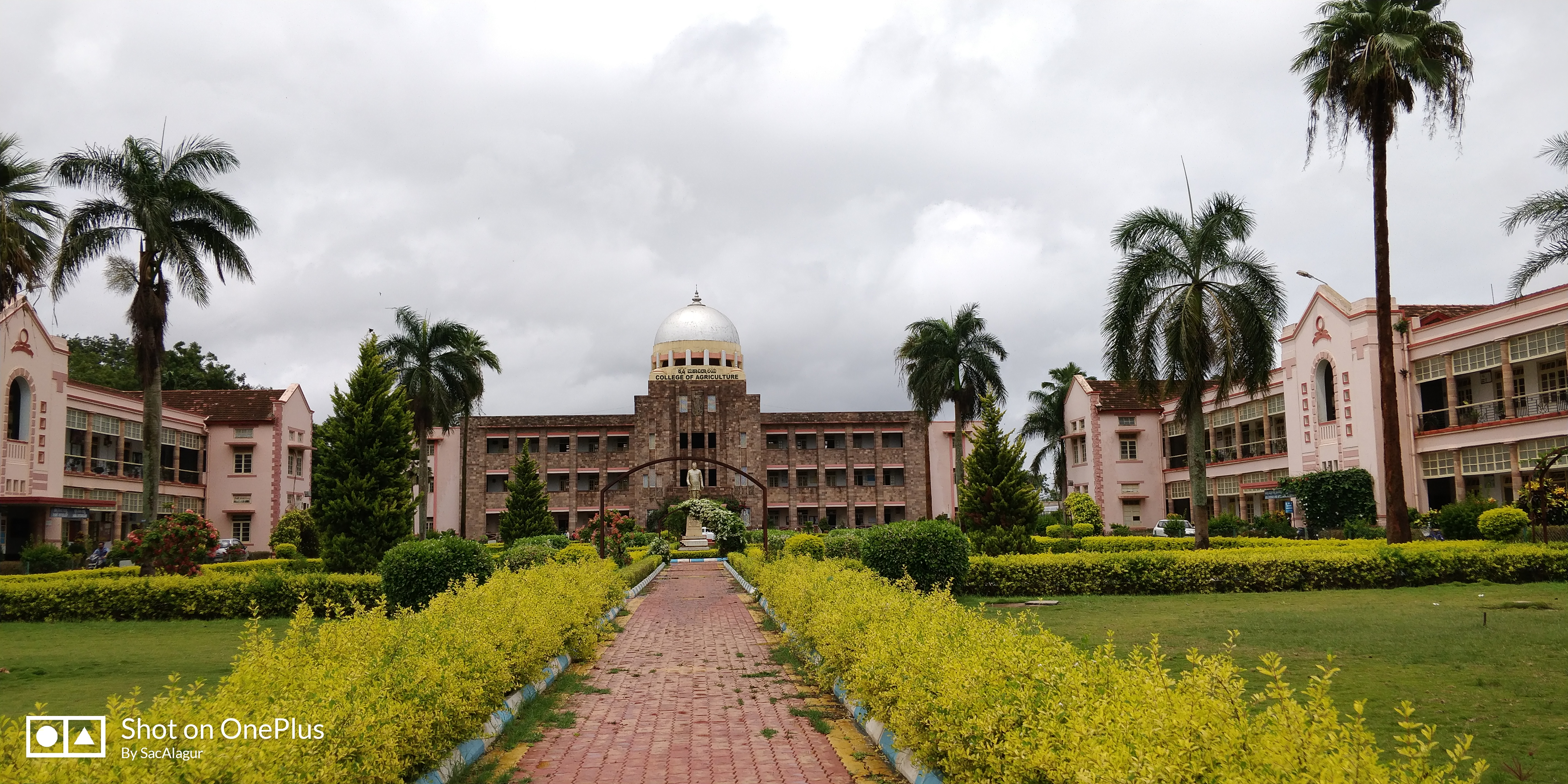
University of Agricultural Sciences, Dharwad

== Educational institutions ==
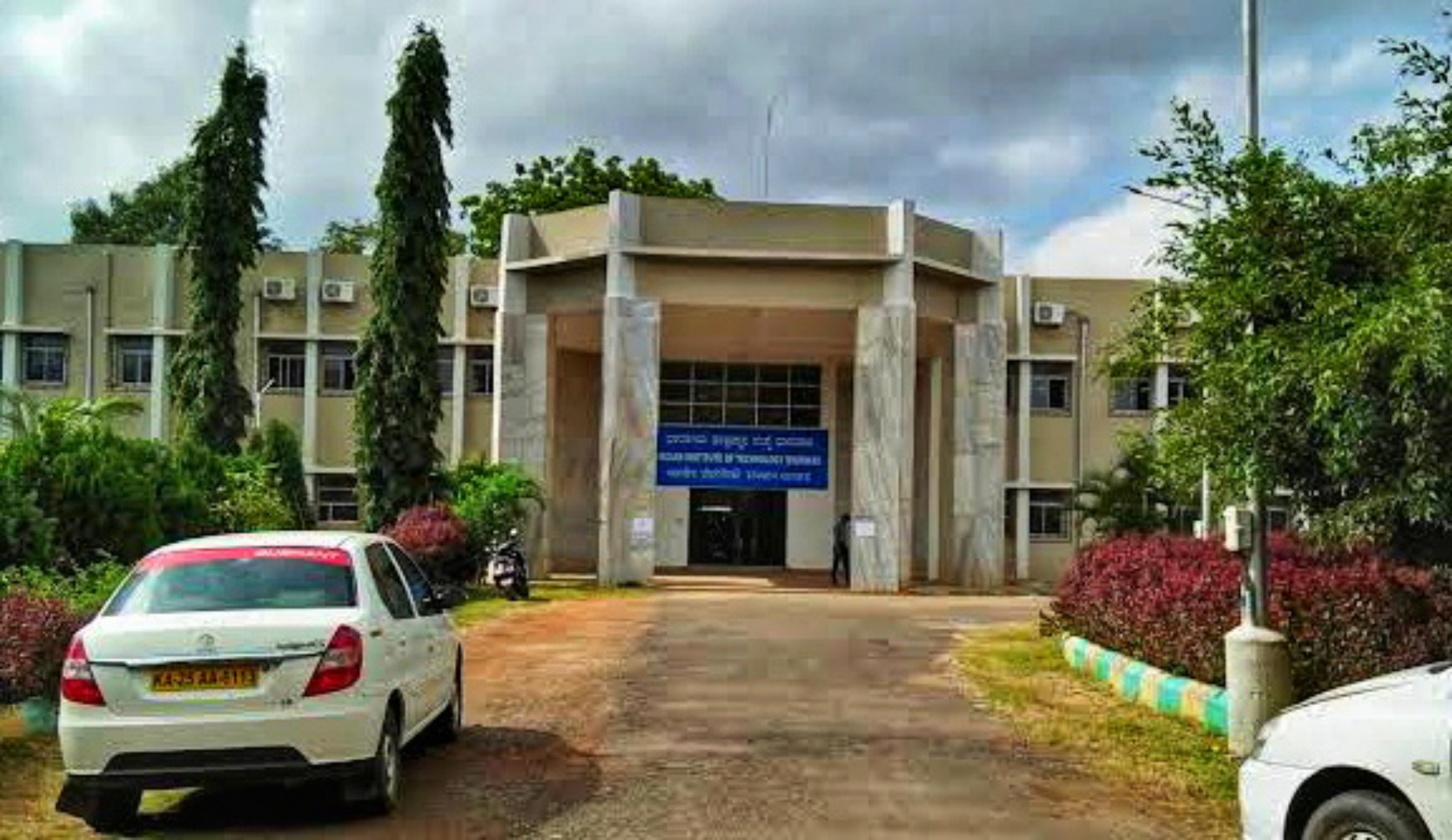
Indian Institute of Technology Dharwad (IIT Dharwad) in Belur Industrial Area (2016–2023)

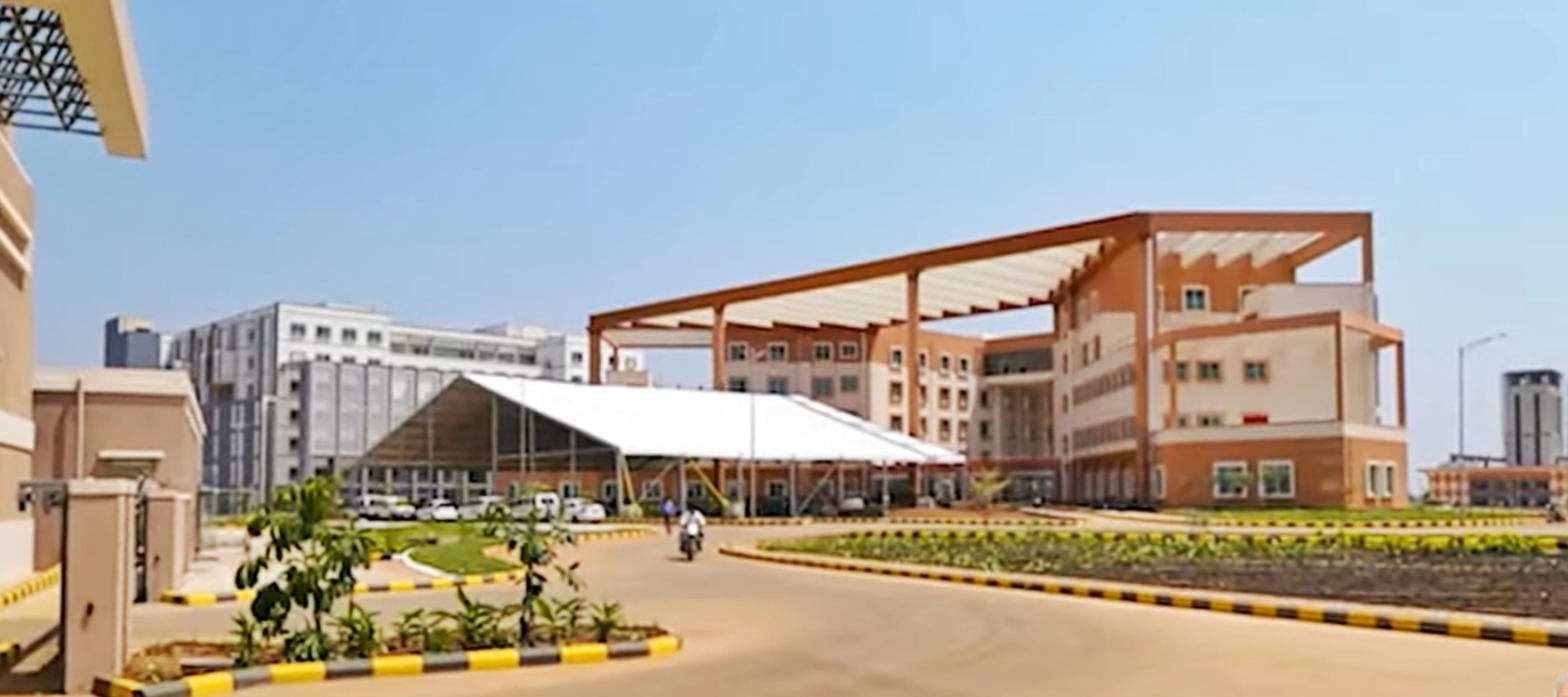
IIT Dharwad permanent campus inaugurated in March 2023

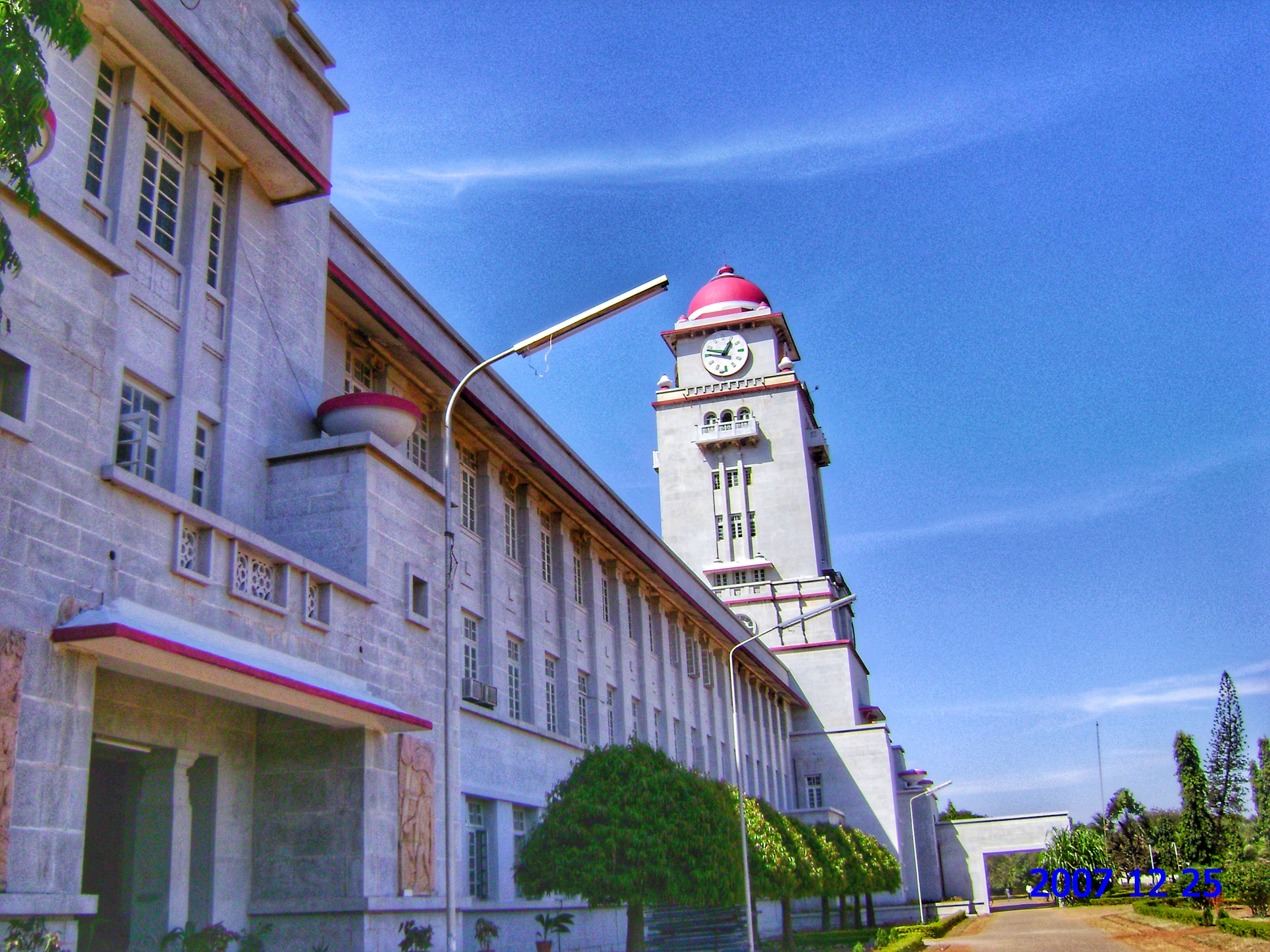
Karnatak University

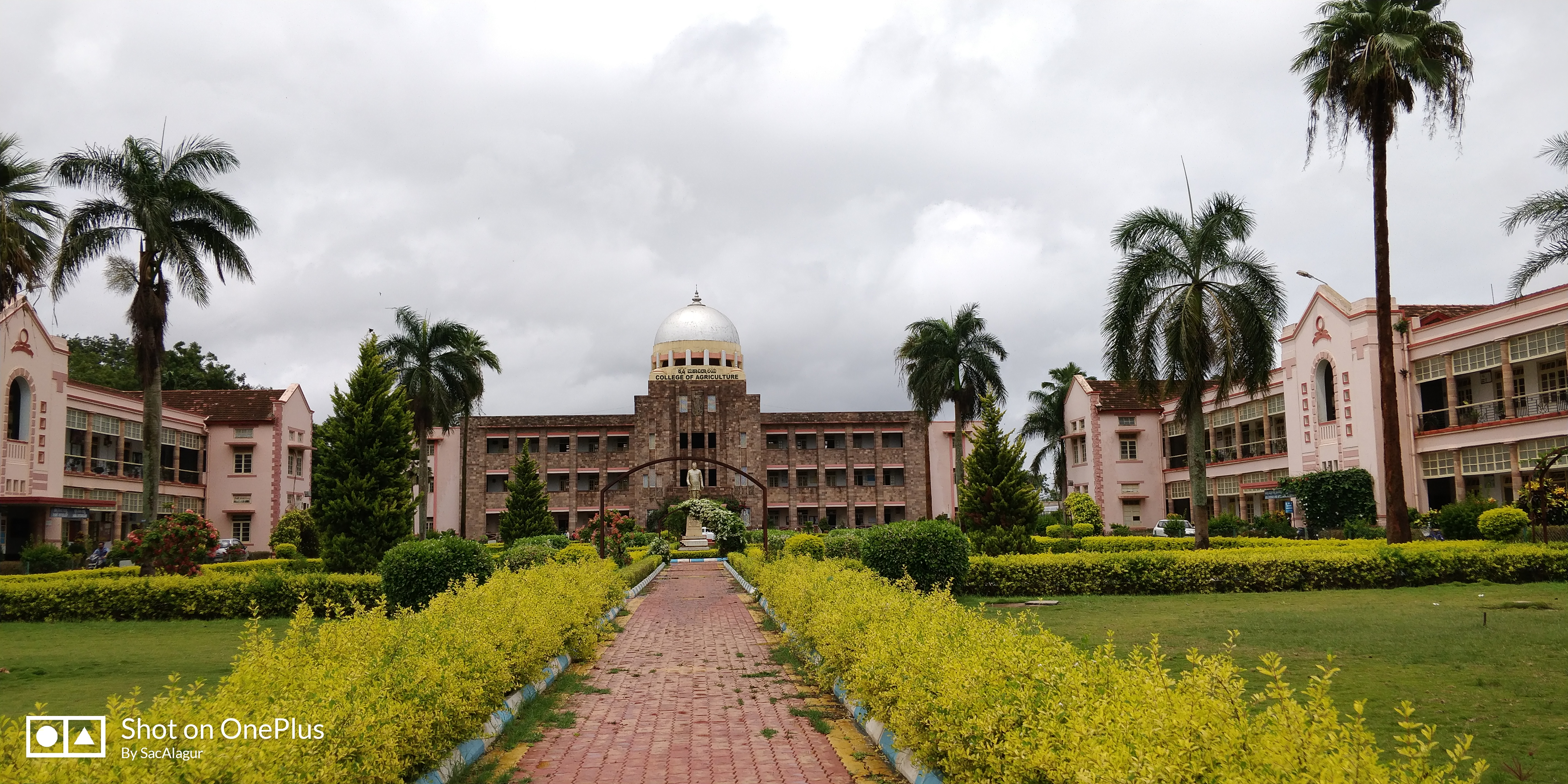
University of Agricultural Sciences, Dharwad

Dharwad hosts many Universities, Colleges and Autonomous Institutions, some are listed below.

- Dakshina Bharat Hindi Prachar Sabha, Dharwad provincial branch. In 1964, the institution was recognized by the Indian Government as one of the Institutes of National Importance.
- Dharwad Institute of Mental Health and Neurosciences (DIMHANS) - established in 1845.
- Indian Institute of Information Technology, Dharwad (IIITDWD) - One of 25 IIITs, it was established in 2015.
- Indian Institute of Technology Dharwad (IIT Dharwad) - One of 23 IITs, it was established in 2016.
- Karnatak College - established in 1917.
- Karnatak University - established in 1949.
- KLE Technological University B. V. Bhoomaraddi College of Engineering and Technology - established in 1947.
- National Forensic Sciences University, Dharwad campus - established in 2023
- University of Agricultural Sciences, Dharwad (UASD) - established in 1986.

== Villages and localities ==
- Gandhinagar
- Hosayellapur
- Malmaddi
- Narayanpur
- Saptapur
- Saraswatpur
- Vidyagiri
