= Hosayellapur =

- Suburb
- Hosayellapur
- Location in Karnataka, India
- Coordinates: 15.457°N 75.018°E
- Country: India
- State: Karnataka
- Metro: Dharwad

Government
  - Type: Municipal corporation
  - Body: Hubli-Dharwad Municipal Corporation
- Elevation: 798 m (2,618 ft)

Population
  - Total: 112,382

Languages
  - Official: Kannada
- Time zone: UTC+5:30 (IST)
- PIN: 580001
- Area code: 0836
- Vehicle registration: KA-25
- Lok Sabha constituency: Dharwad (Lok Sabha constituency)
- Planning agency: Hubli–Dharwad Urban Development Authority

Hosayellapur is a locality in Dharwad City in Karnataka State, India. It is one of the oldest localities in Dharwad. Hebballi Agasi, Kamanakatti, KHN Colony, Shivpuri Colony and Maratha Colony are some nearby localities to Hosayellapur.
