= Saptapur =

- Neighbourhood
- Saptapura
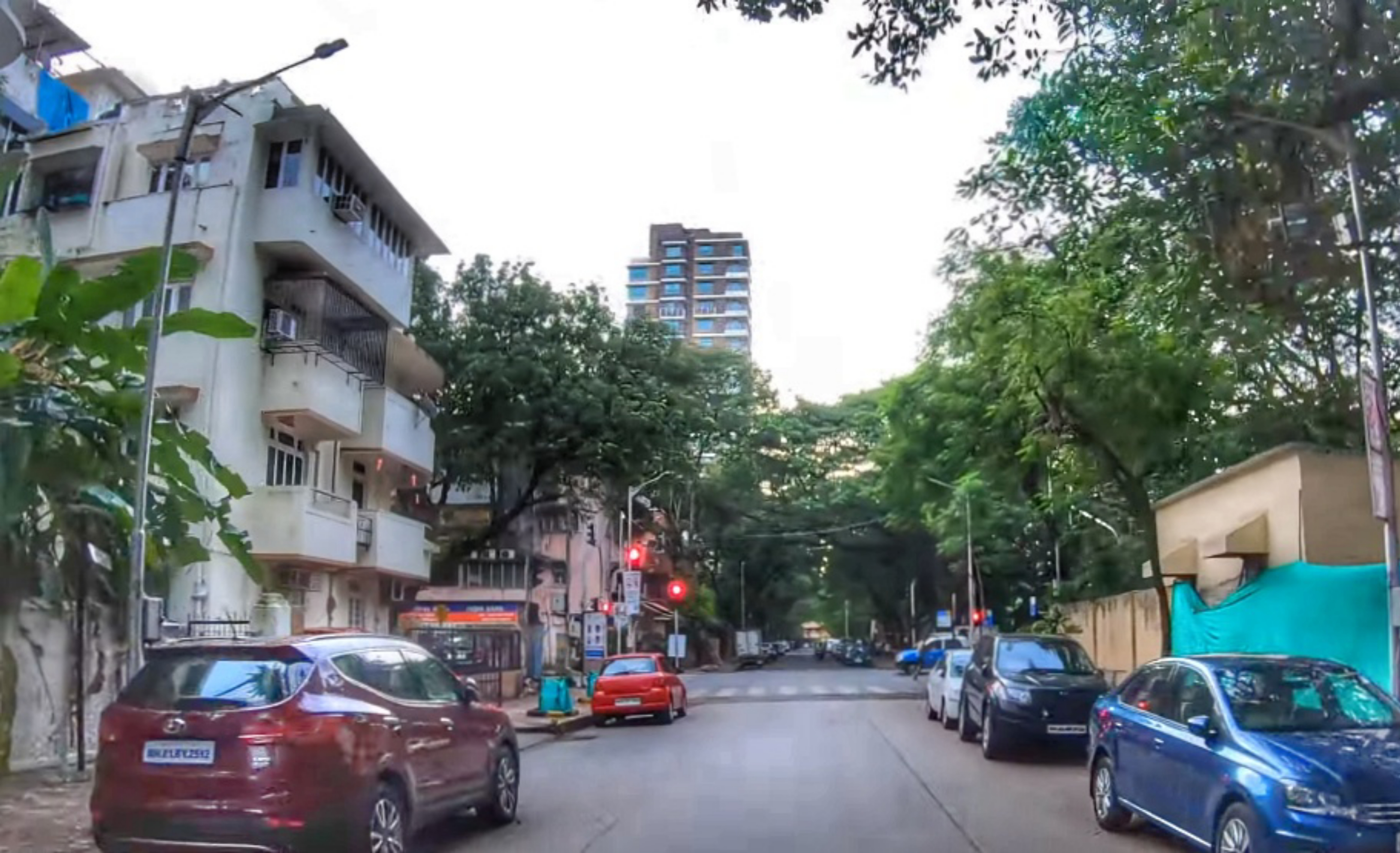
- Jayanagar Cross

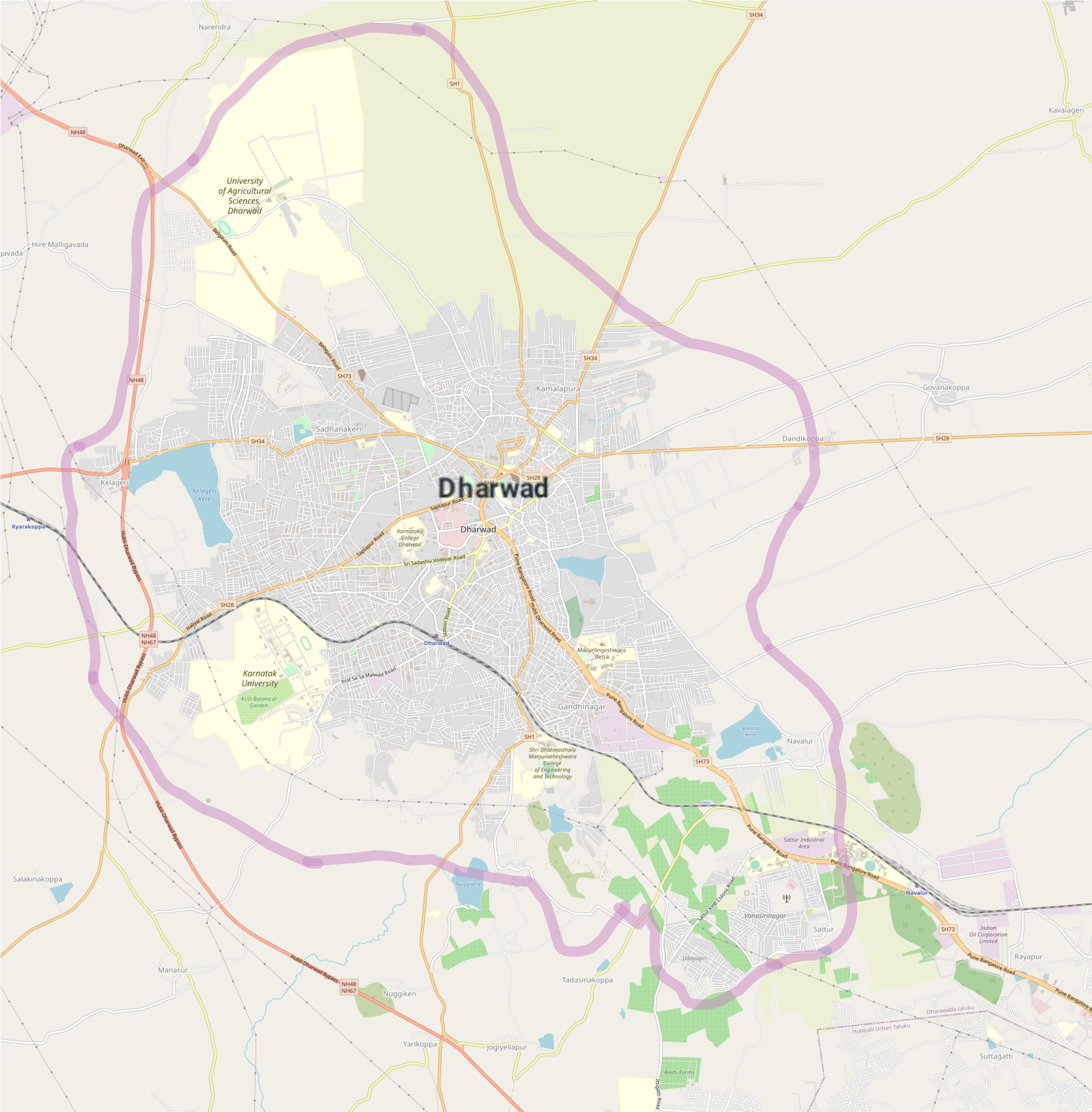
- Location within Dharwad
- Coordinates: 15.449912°N 74.990695°E
- Country: India
- State: Karnataka
- City: Dharwad

Government
  - Type: Municipal Corporation
  - Body: Hubli-Dharwad Municipal Corporation

Population (2011)
  - Total: 84,461

Languages
  - Official: Kannada
- Time zone: UTC+5:30 (IST)
- PIN: 580001
- Vehicle registration: KA-25
- Lok Sabha constituency: Dharwad (Lok Sabha constituency)
- Planning agency: Hubli–Dharwad Urban Development Authority

Saptapur, officially Saptapura is a residential neighborhood and business hub in the south-west of Dharwad city. It is bordered by Malmaddi in the east, Srinagar and KUD in the south, Narayanpur in the north & Kalyan Nagar in the south-east.

== Etymology ==
The word "Saptapur" comes from the Sanskrit word "Sapta-Pur" meaning Seven towns. Saptapur is made up of Seven major localities they are Jay Nagar, Bharti Nagar, Michigan Compound, CB Nagar, Vijayanand Nagar, State Bank Colony and Tungabhadra HDS.

== Saptapur Well ==
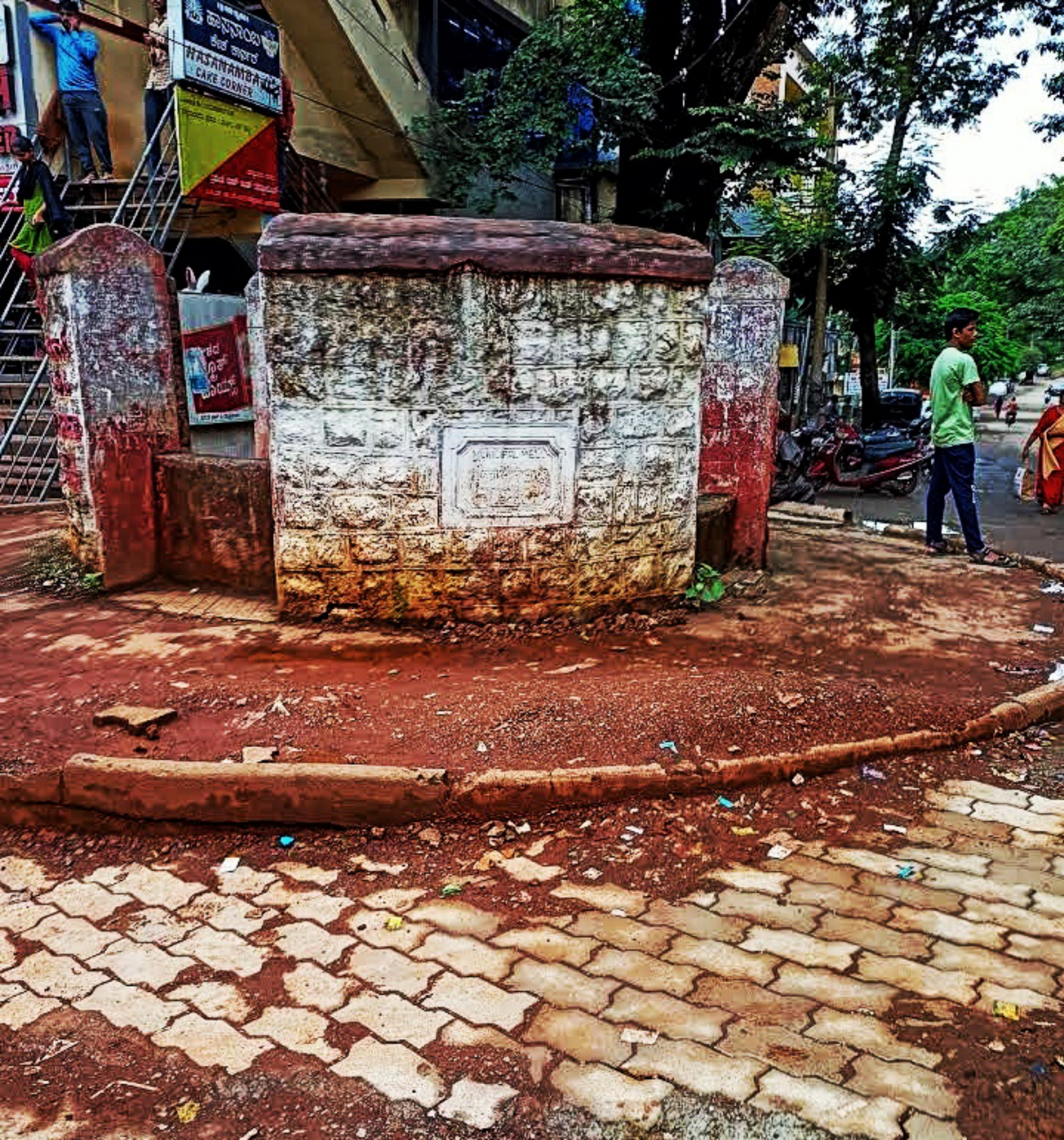
Saptapur Well

Saptapur Well also known as Saptapur Baavi is a well located on Saptapur Circle adjacent to KCD College Circle. It is very popular for Ganesh Visarjan during the festival of Ganesh Chaturthi.

== Landmarks ==
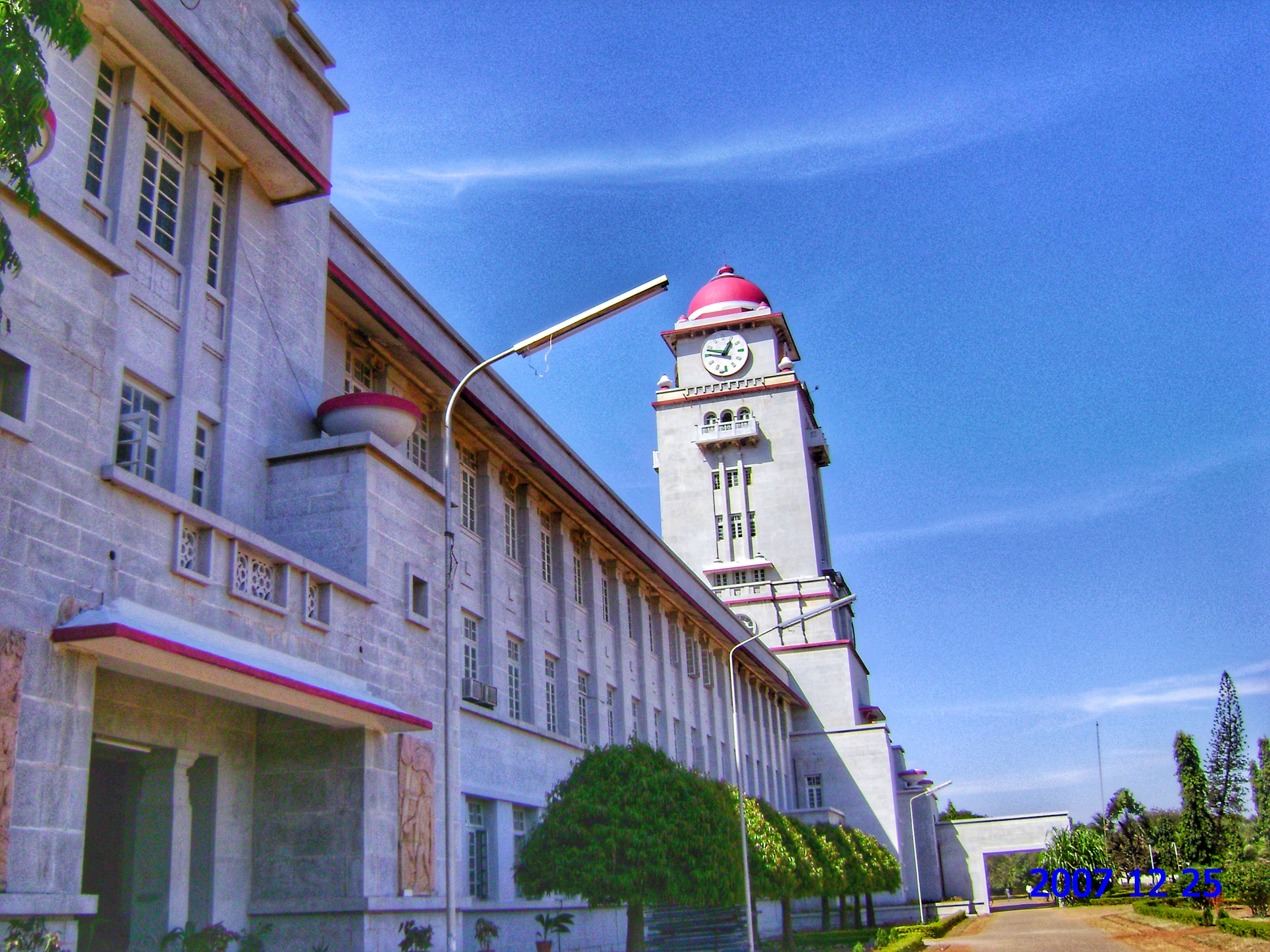
Karnatak University, Pavte Nagar

Karnatak University is one of the most prominent universities of the state, is located in the Pavte Nagar area of Saptpaur, The campus is spread over 750 acers of land. Due to the university the area has developed many hostels and PGs for students.

== Localities ==
Localities of Saptapur include Jay Nagar, Bharti Nagar, Michgan Compound, CB Nagar, Vijayanand Nagar, State Bank Colony and Tungabhadra HDS.
