= Shankar Kumbi =

Indian social worker and environmentalist (born 1958)

Shankar Kumbi (born June 1958) is a noted Indian social worker and environmentalist in Dharwad, Karnataka, India. He is the president of a non-governmental organization, Hubli Dharwad Nagarika Parisar Samithi, he founded in 1995. and an executive committee member of Karnatak Vidyavardhak Sangha (KVS).

He has been rewarded with many awards for his contribution to the society. At a very young age he started devoting himself in social work. He is the recipient of "Karnataka state youth award" in 1990. For his notable work towards protection of environment, he was awarded the Parisar Award in 1998 and Rajyotsava Puraskar in 2012, by the Government of Karnataka.

== Career ==
He was earlier aligned with Janata Dal, though later joined the BJP, he has also served as Councillor in Hubli-Dharwad Municipal Corporation (HDMC) for a decade. Also he has served as district president of Bharat Seva Dal in 2006.
