= Kelgeri =

Coordinates: 12°44′N 77°08′E

- Neighbourhood
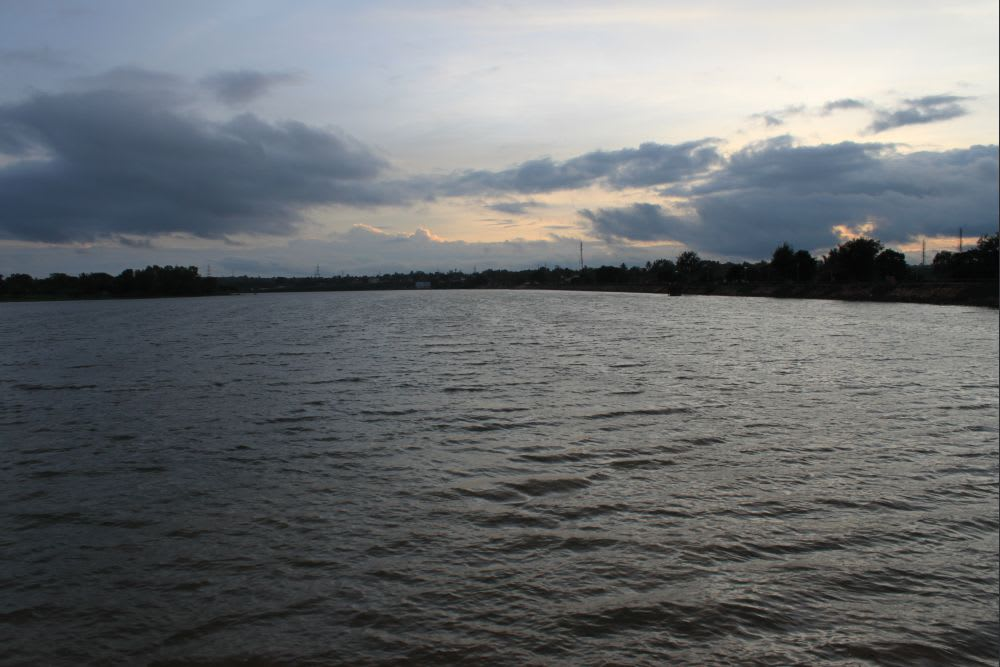
- Lake in Kelgeri
- Interactive map of Kelgeri
- Country: India
- State: Karnataka
- Metro: Dharwad

Government
  - Type: Municipal corporation
  - Body: Hubli-Dharwad Municipal Corporation

Population (2011)
  - Total: 1,083

Languages
  - Official: Kannada
- Time zone: UTC+5:30 (IST)
- ISO 3166 code: IN-KA
- Vehicle registration: KA
- Website: karnataka.gov.in

Kelgeri is a locality in Dharwad of Karnataka, India. It is surrounded by Kelgeri lake. The Dharwad–Hubli bypass road passes through the area. The famous Dharwad buffaloes are plentiful in this area. Buffalo farming is the main business. It is common to see people with several cans hanging on their bicycles in the morning, supplying milk to remote places of Dharwad. People selling milk are called by the name Gou li.

Apart from milk, Kelgeri has many good cooks of jowar roti that is famous in North Karnataka.

The nearest localities are Vinayak Nagar and Sadhan Keri.

== Demographics ==
As of the 2011 Census of India there were 153 households in Kelgeri and a total population of 1,083 consisting of 611 males and 472 females. There were 74 children ages 0–6.
