= Gandhinagar (disambiguation) =

Gandhinagar is the capital city of the Indian state of Gujarat.

Gandhinagar or Gandhi Nagar may also refer to the following places in India:

== Associated with Gandhinagar, Gujarat ==
- Gandhinagar district
- Gandhinagar Lok Sabha constituency
- Gandhinagar North Assembly constituency
- Gandhinagar South Assembly constituency
- Gandhinagar Capital railway station

== Other places ==
- Gandhi Nagar, Great Nicobar, Andaman and Nicobar Islands
- Gandhinagar, Vijayawada, Andhra Pradesh
- Gandhinagar, Guwahati, Assam
- Gandhi Nagar, Delhi
  - Gandhi Nagar, Delhi Assembly constituency
- Gandhinagar, Jammu and Kashmir, associated with Gandhinagar, Jammu and Kashmir Assembly constituency
- Gandhi Nagar, Bengaluru, Karnataka
  - Gandhi Nagar (Vidhana Sabha constituency)
- Gandhinagar, Dharwad, Karnataka
- Gandhi Nagar, Sindhanur, Karnataka
- Gandhi Nagar, Kochi, Kerala
- Gandhinagar, Thrissur, Kerala
- Gandhinagar, Kolhapur, Maharashtra
- Gandhinagar, Palghar, Maharashtra
- Gandhi Nagar, Chennai, Tamil Nadu
- Gandhinagar, Tiruvannamalai, Tamil Nadu
- Gandhinagar, Vellore, Tamil Nadu

== Transportation ==
- Gandhinagar Airport, Nashik, Maharashtra
- Gandhi Nagar (Kanjurmarg) metro station, Mumbai Metro, Maharashtra
- Gandhi Nagar Mor metro station, Jaipur Metro, Rajasthan
- Gandhinagar Jaipur railway station, Jaipur, Rajasthan

== See also ==
- Gandhinagar Assembly constituency (disambiguation)
