= Vidyagiri, Dharwad =

Vidyagiri
- Neighborhood
- Vidyagiri
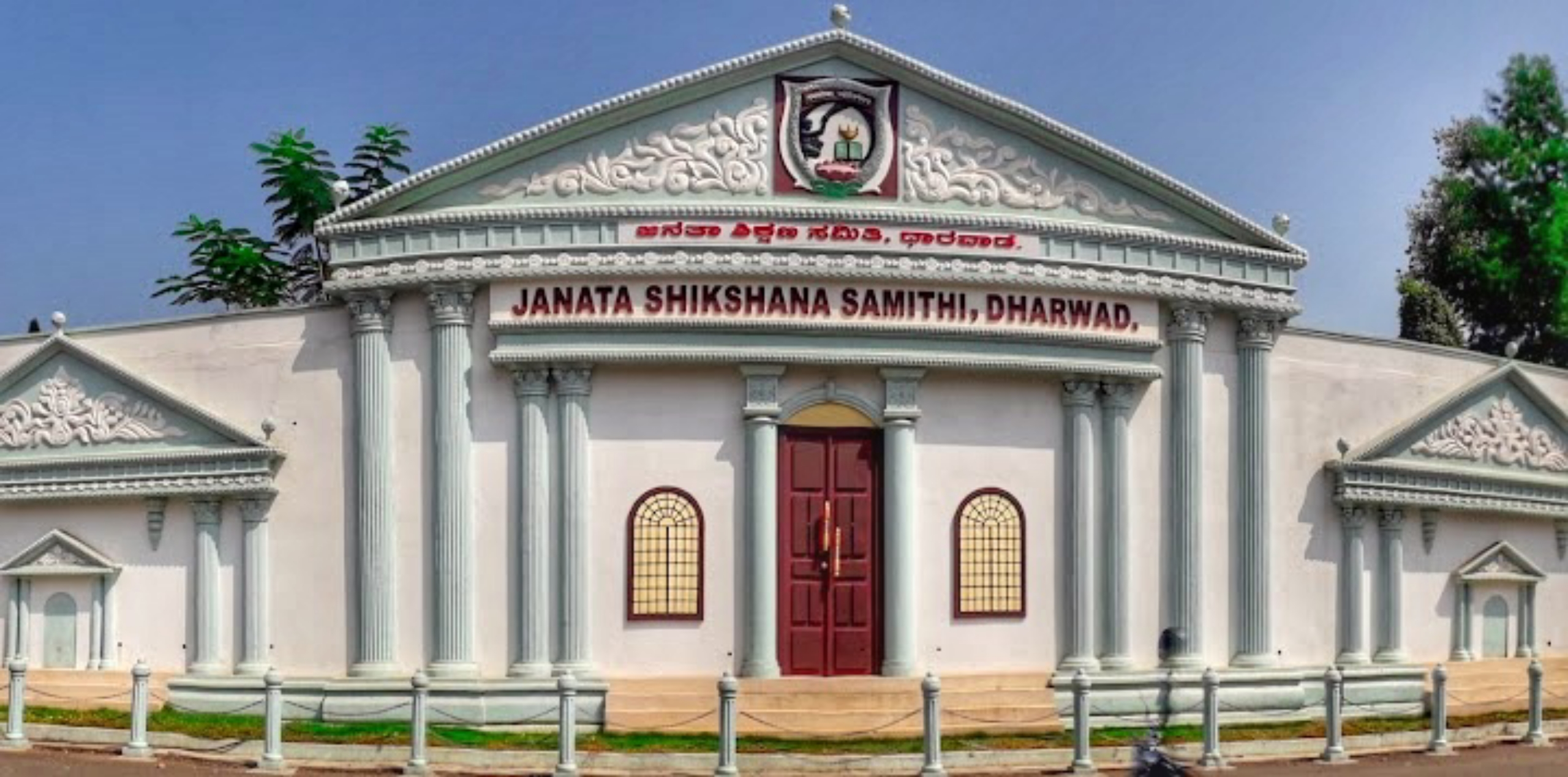
- Entrance of Janata Shikshan Samithi (JSS) campus at Vidyagiri cross.

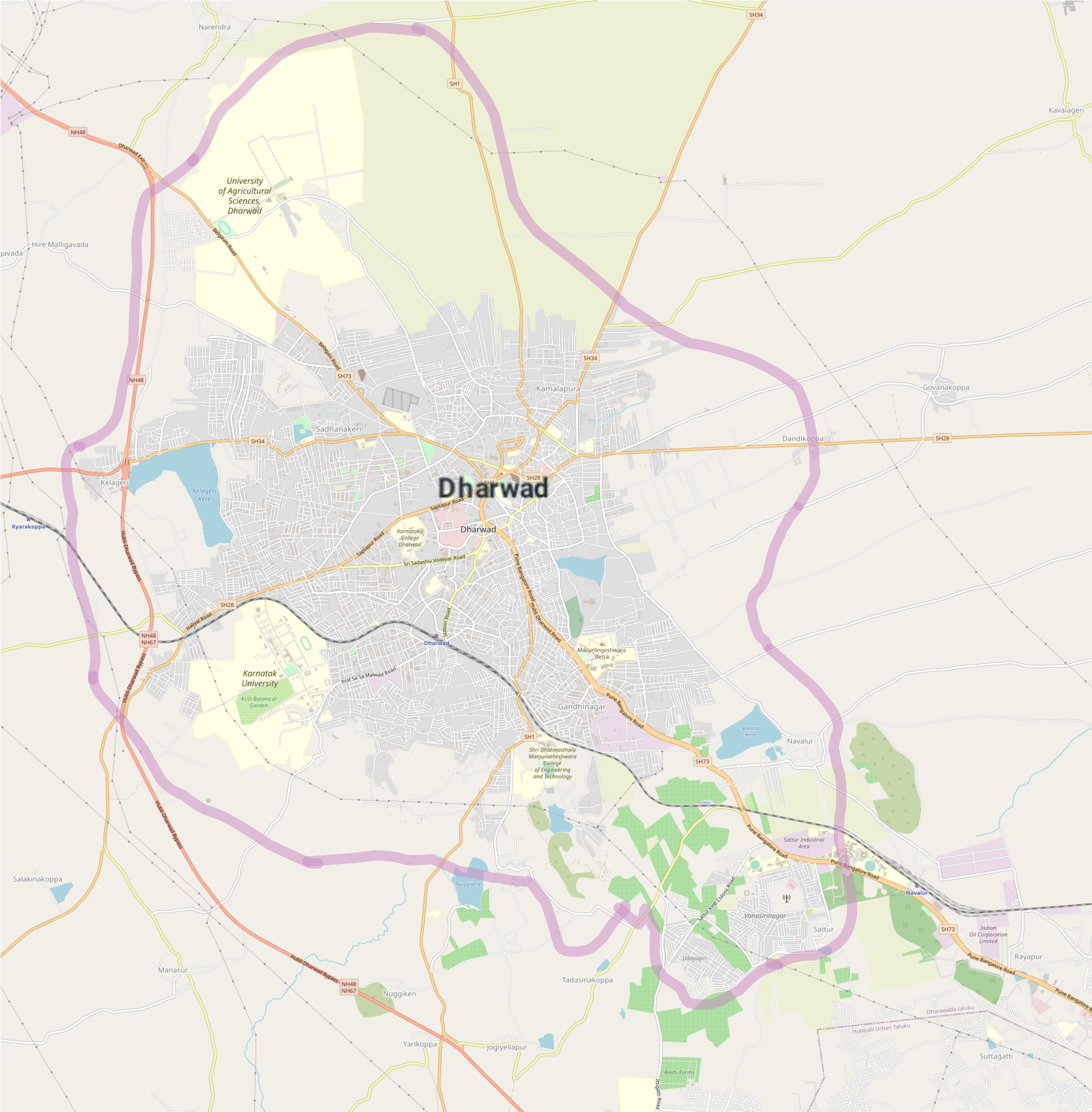
- Location in Dharwad Vidyagiri (Karnataka) Vidyagiri (India)
- Coordinates: 15.447°N 75.022°E
- Country: India
- State: Karnataka
- Metro: Dharwad

Government
  - Type: Municipal corporation
  - Body: Hubli-Dharwad Municipal Corporation
- Elevation: 782 m (2,566 ft)

Languages
  - Official: Kannada
- Time zone: UTC+5:30 (IST)
- Postal code: 580004
- Area code: 0836
- Vehicle registration: KA-25
- Lok Sabha constituency: Dharwad (Lok Sabha constituency)
- Planning agency: Hubli–Dharwad Urban Development Authority
- Rapid Transit: Hubballi-Dharwad Bus Rapid Transit System

Vidyagiri (Literally means "Hill of Knowledge" Vidya - Knowledge Giri - Hill in kannada language) is a small locality located in the eastern part of Dharwad city in India. Vidyagiri is known for its educational institutions located on the top of its hill. It is home to Janata Shikshan Samithi (JSS) campus of chain of educational centers, schools & colleges.

== Etymology ==
In Kannada language the meaning of "Vidyagiri" is "Hill of knowledge" if split, Vidya means knowledge & Giri means hill. It is called so because of the number of educational centres.

== Educational institutions ==
- Dr. D Veerendra Heggade Institute of Management Studies and Research
- JSS Public School
- Shri Manjunatheshwar Pre University College (SMPU)
- JSS RS Hukkerikar Science, Arts and Commerce college
- JSS Shri Manjunatheshwar Central School
- JSS College of Education (B.ed)
- S.K Gubbi College science college
- JSS KH Kabbur Institute of Engineering College
- JSS Shri Manjunatheshwar ITI College
- R.S Hukkerikar College of Engineering
- Dr. D Veerendra Heggade Institute of Management Studies and Research

== Religious places ==
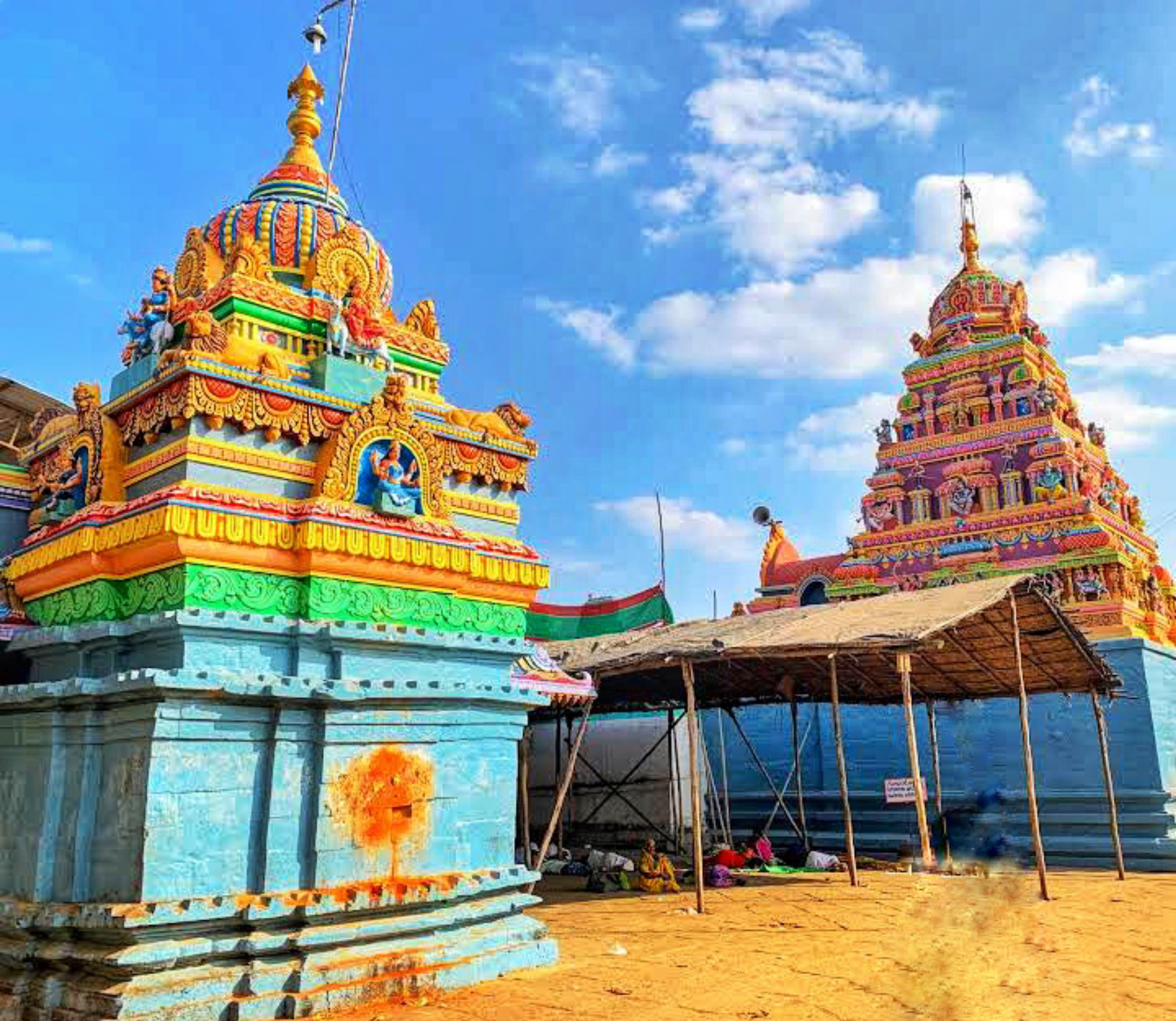
Mailarling Hill Temple

The Vidyagiri locality has numerous religious sites.

- Mailarlingeshwar Temple
- Mailarlingeshwar Temple at Mailarling Hill, Vidyagiri is one of the oldest temple in the city of Dharwad, It is dedicated to Hinduism with the idol of lord Shiva in the shrine of the temple, the temple was renovated in 2007 the temple is at the elevation of 844m from the sea level.
- Shankar Mutt, Vidyagiri

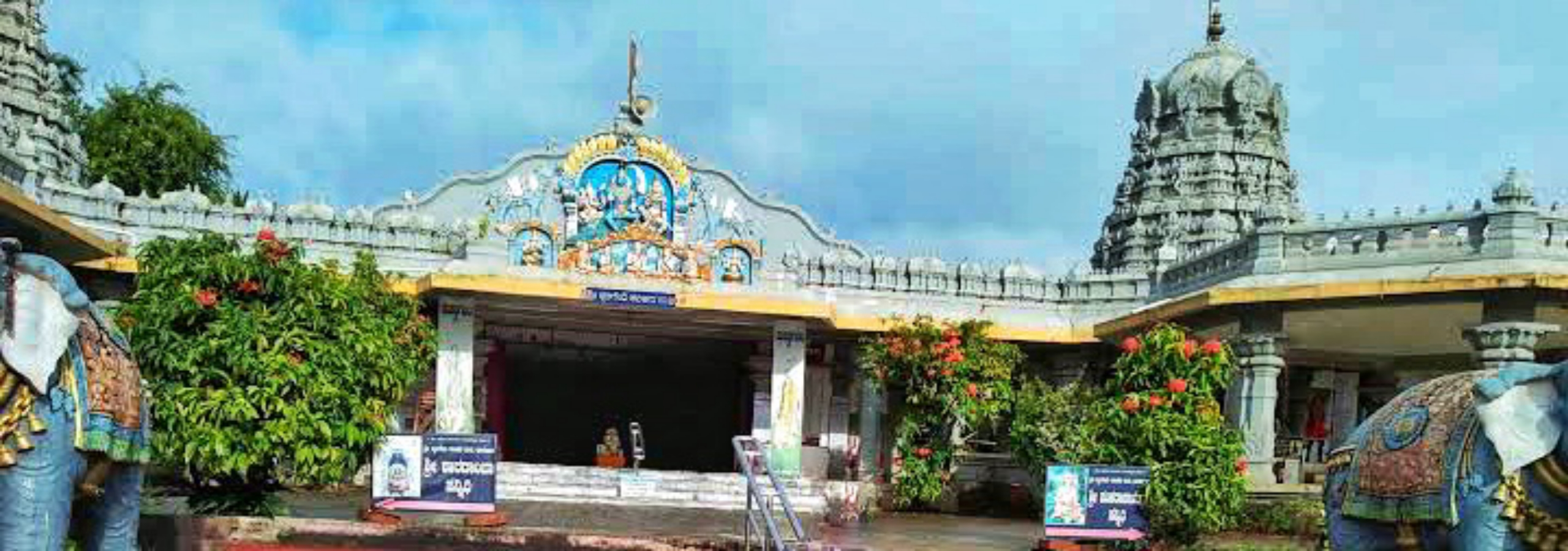
Shankar Mutt, Vidyagiri

Sri Sringeri Shankar Math at Vidyagiri is one of the most popular mathas in Dharwad and North Karnataka region. The mutt was built in 1984 and it is one of the branches of the Sri Sri Jagadguru Shankaracharya Mahasamsthanam of Shringeri.

== Location ==
Vidygiri is mostly a hilly area which is 708-metre (0.708 km) above the sea level with numerous educational institutions.

The Hubli Airport is approximately 19 km (12 mi) away from Vidyagiri and the KSRTC new bus station (Dharwad) is 5 km (3.1 mi) far from the main centre of Vidyagiri.

== Residential areas ==
Vidyagiri intakes few smaller residential areas as Daneshwari Nagar in the north and Vivekananda Nagar in the south joint with Rajatgiri which is a part of Gandhinagar.
