= Narayanpur, Dharwad =

Municipality in Karnataka, India

Narayanpura ನಾರಾಯಣಪುರ
- Neighbourhood
- Narayanpura
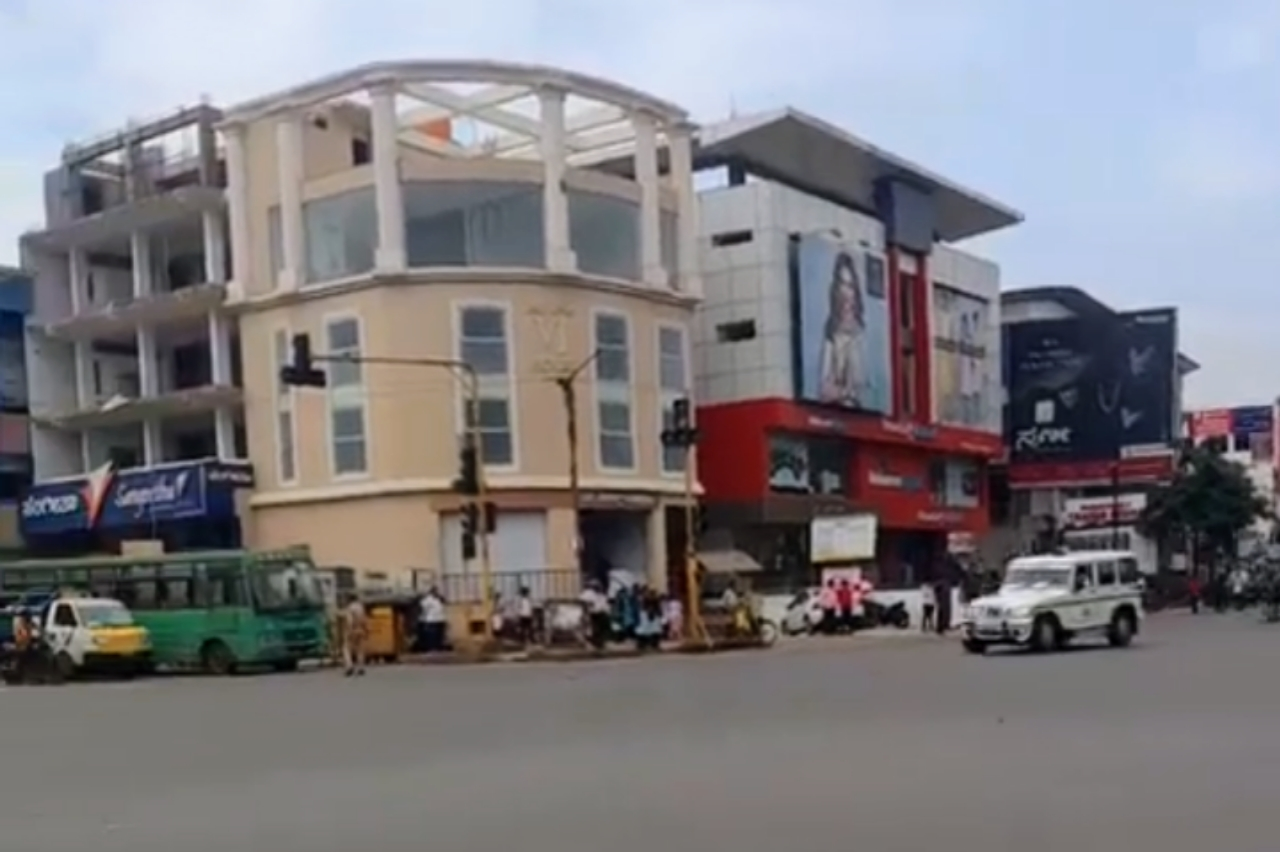
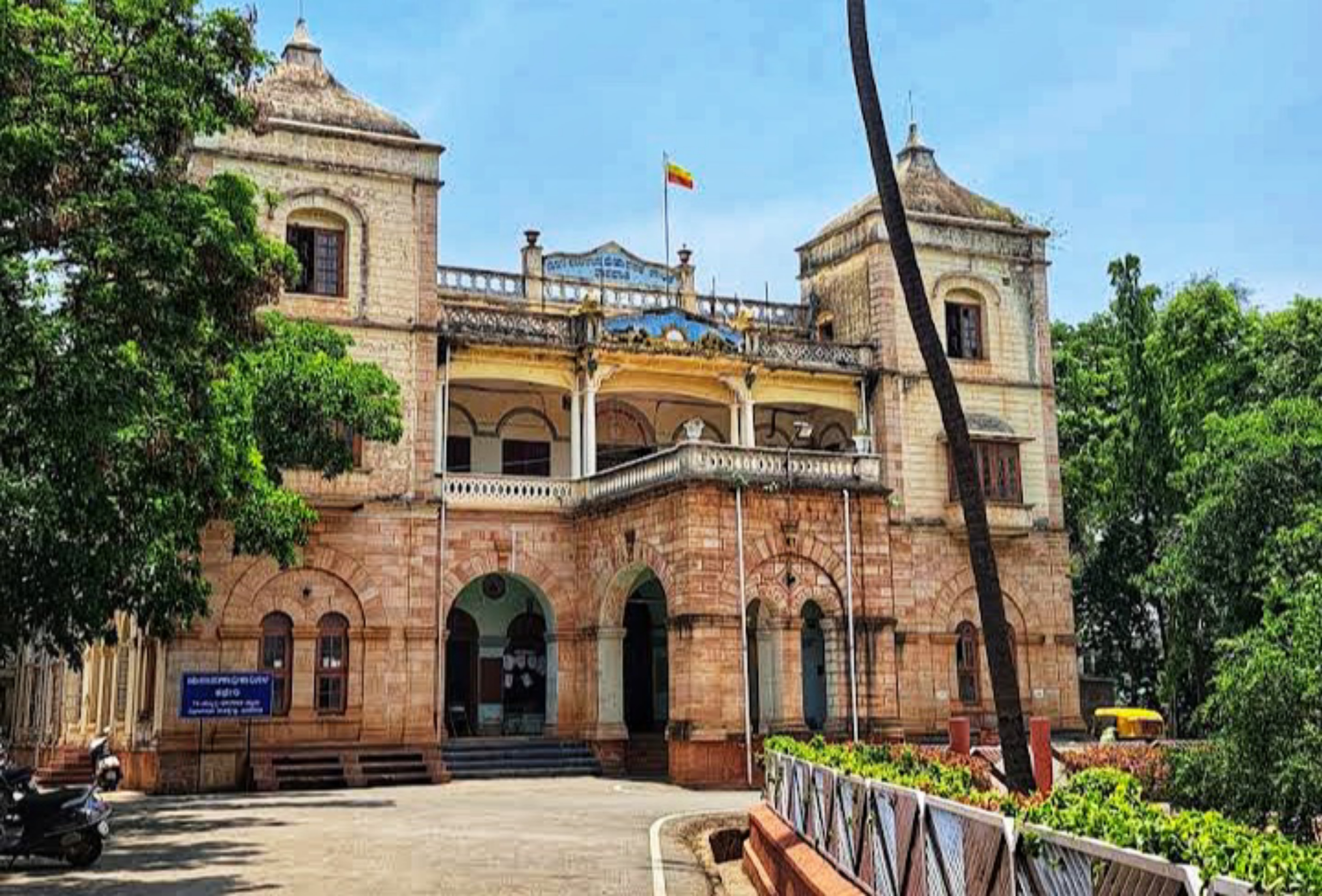
- From top, Jubilee Circle, Hubli-Dharwad Municipal Corporation (HDMC) office Dharwad.

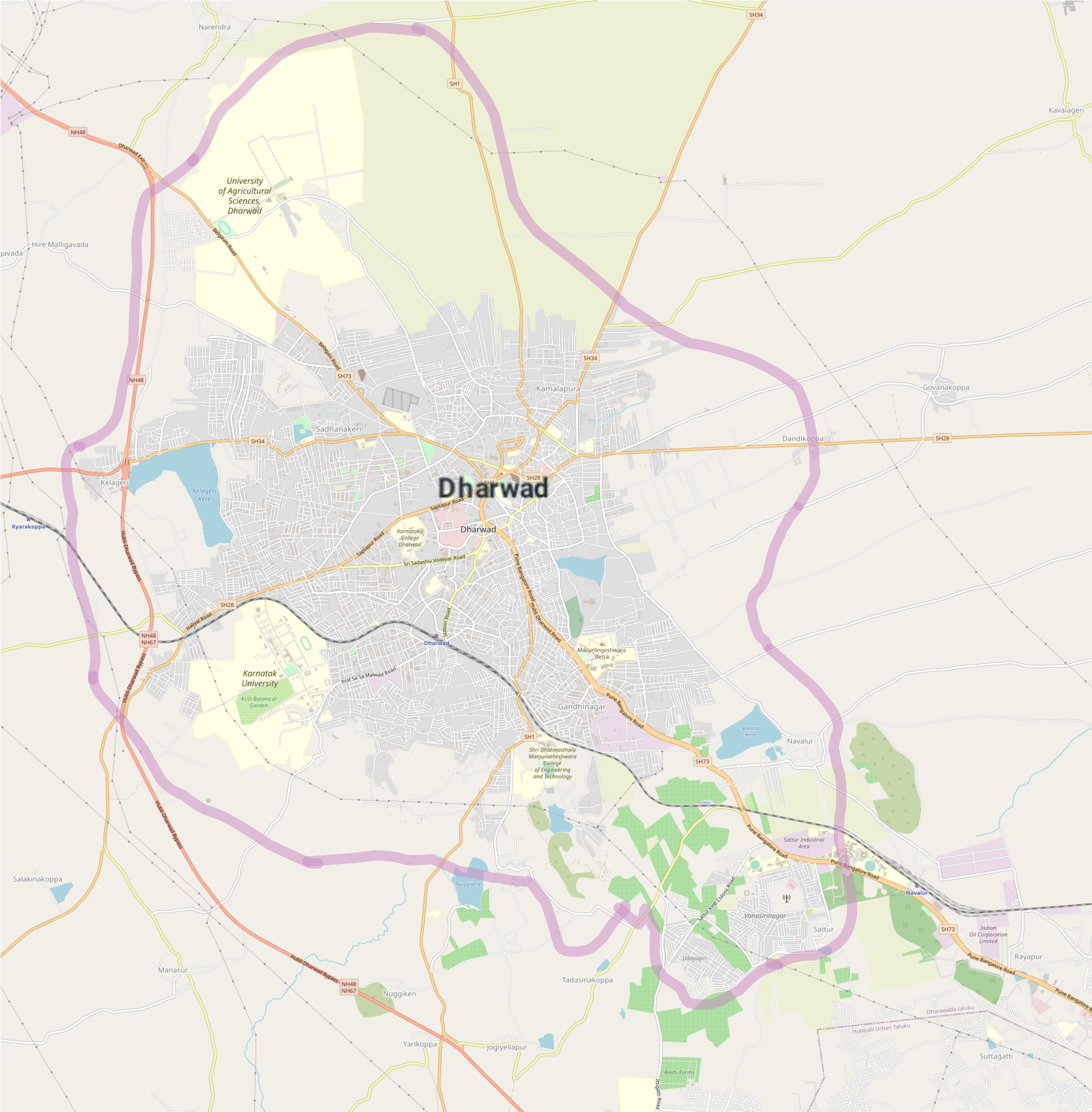
- Location within Dharwad Location within Karnataka
- Coordinates: 15.461411°N 74.998483°E
- State: Karnataka
- District: Dharwad district
- Metro: Dharwad
- ward: 02

Government
  - Type: Municipal Corporation
  - Body: HDMC

Languages
  - Official: Kannada
- Time zone: UTC+5:30 (IST)
- PIN: 580008
- Vehicle registration: KA-25
- Lok Sabha constituency: Dharwad Lok Sabha constituency
- Vidhan Sabha constituency: Dharwad Assembly constituency
- Planning agency: Hubballi-Dharwad Urban Development Authority (HDUDA)

Narayanpura, also known as Narayanpur, is a locality in Northwestern part of Dharwad city, India, which consists of many commercial and residential colonies. It has some of the important government structures such as Kalabhavan, District court and Dharwad Institute of Mental Health and Neurosciences (DIMHANS) on the National Highway 48.

== Geography ==
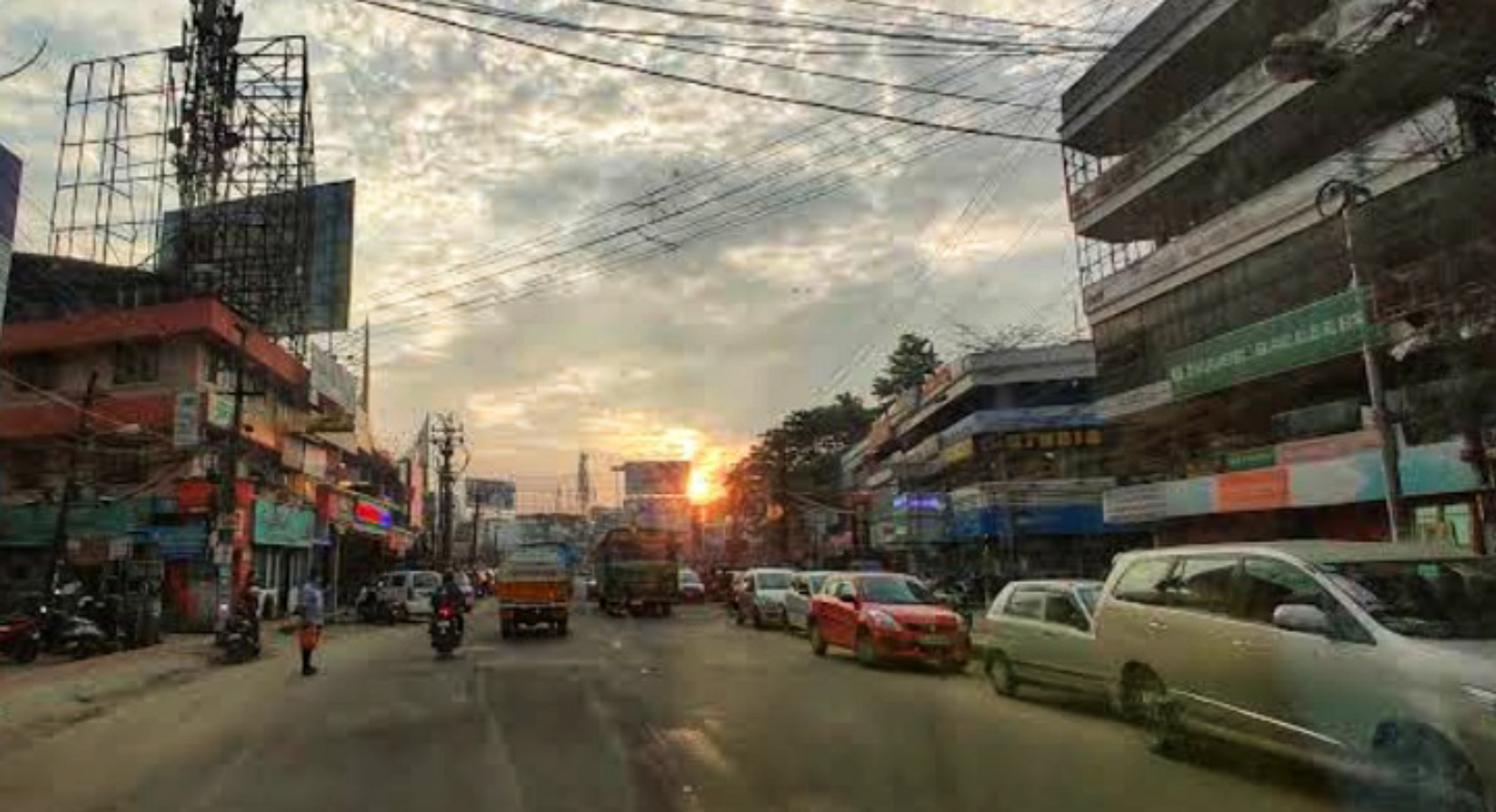
National Highway 48 passing through the locality

Narayanpura is located in the central part of Dharwad city so it is usually a busy locality during the working hours. National Highway 48 passes through this locality connecting Dharwad with state capital Bengaluru and other major cities like Delhi, Jaipur, Surat, Pune, Mumbai, Navi Mumbai, Vellore and Chennai.

== Landmarks ==
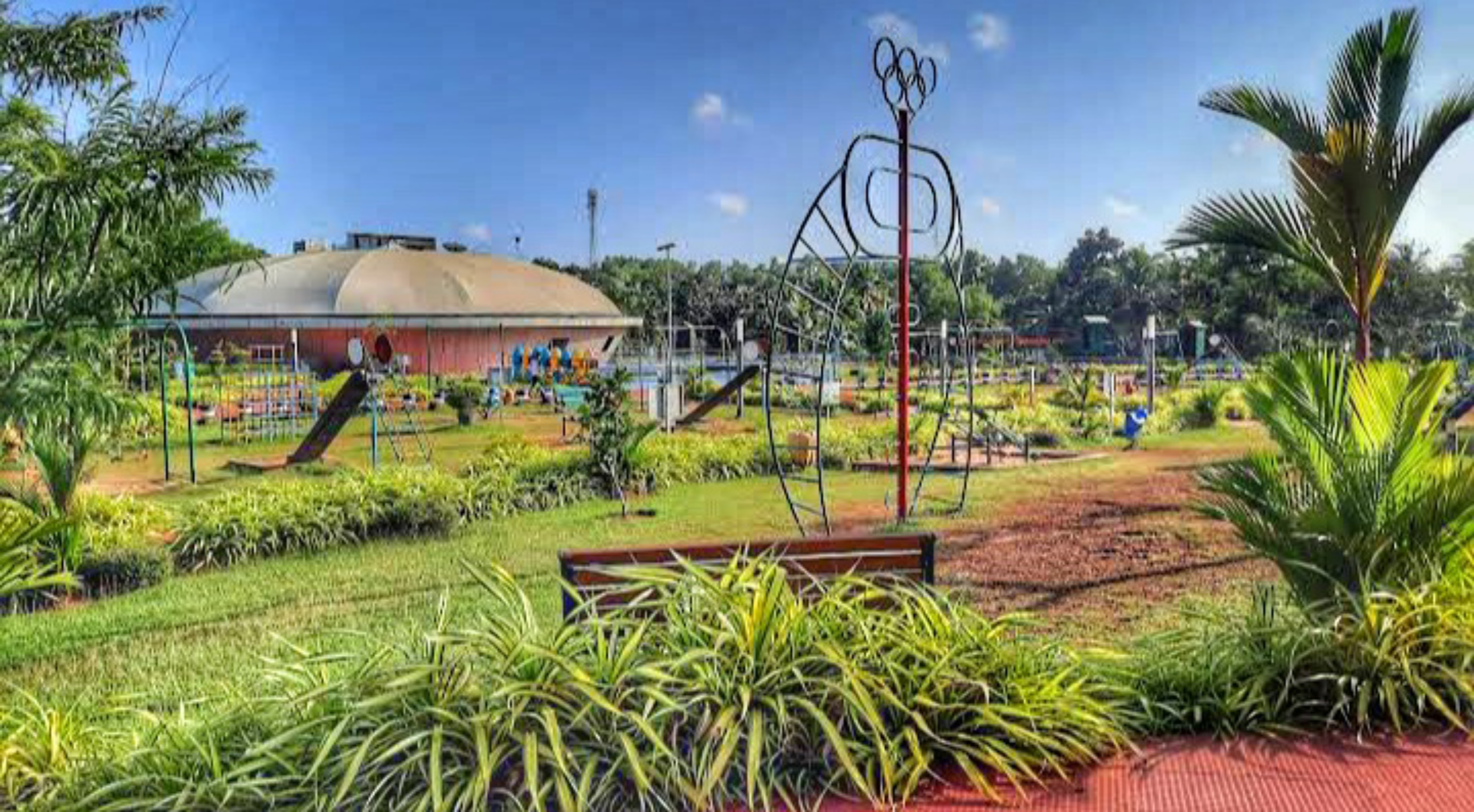
KC Park

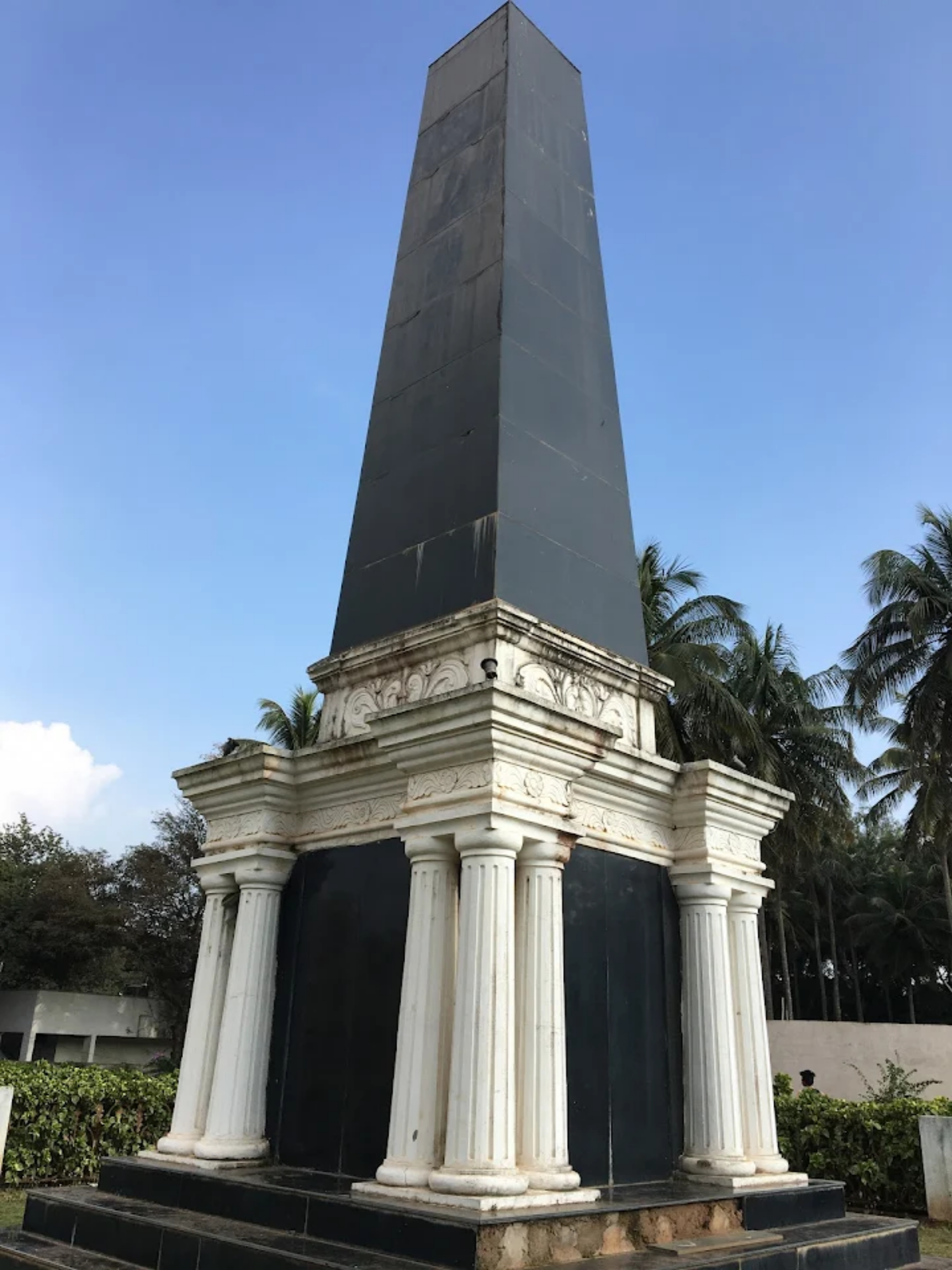
Monument at Kittur Chennamma Park

Narayanpur is popular for its commercial and transport potential as it's close to the main city market and also has important sites like the Dharwad Institute of Mental Health and Neurosciences (DIMHANS) and Kittur Chennamma Park. DIMHANS is one of the largest mental health institutions in South India. Kittur Chennamma Park is a popular botanical garden within the city. The Thackeray's obelisk at Kittur Chennamma park is a popular monument site which was built after his death in 1824. Jubilee Circle is located in the centre of the city where the important government offices function. Kalabhavan is a cultural centre owned by the municipal corporation of the city where all the civil financial activities are being done. The Hubli-Dharwad Municipal Corporation office is located near the HDBRTS terminal.

== Transport ==
Narayanpur is connected to Hubli-Dharwad Bus Rapid Transit System (HDBRTS) and has 2 stations. The Dharwad BRTS Terminal is approximately 2 kilometres (1.2 mi) away from Jubilee Circle.

The nearest railway station Dharwad city railway station which is about 3 kilometres (1.9 mi) away.
