= Gandhinagar, Dharwad =

Gandhinagar
- Neighborhood
- Gandhinagar
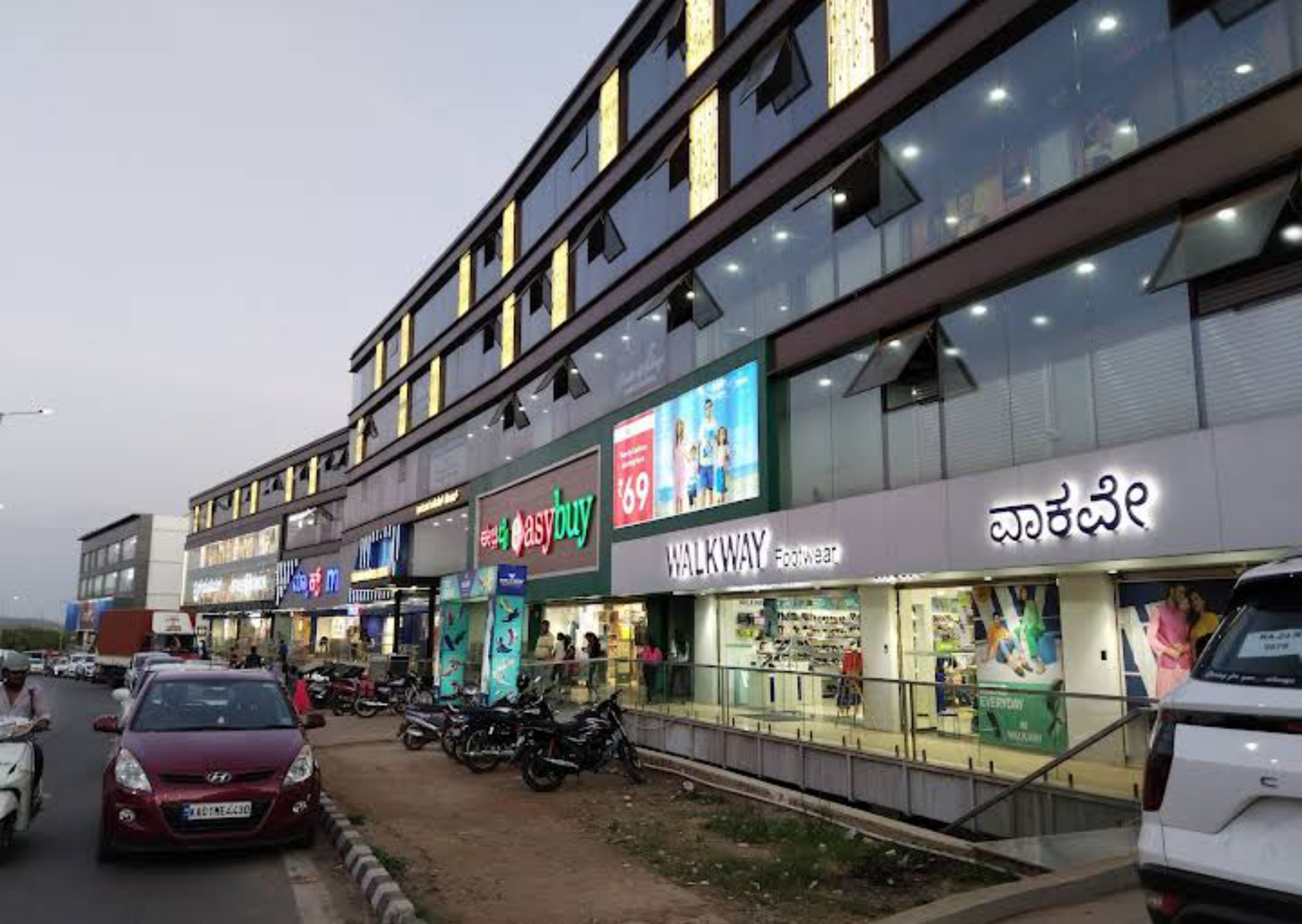
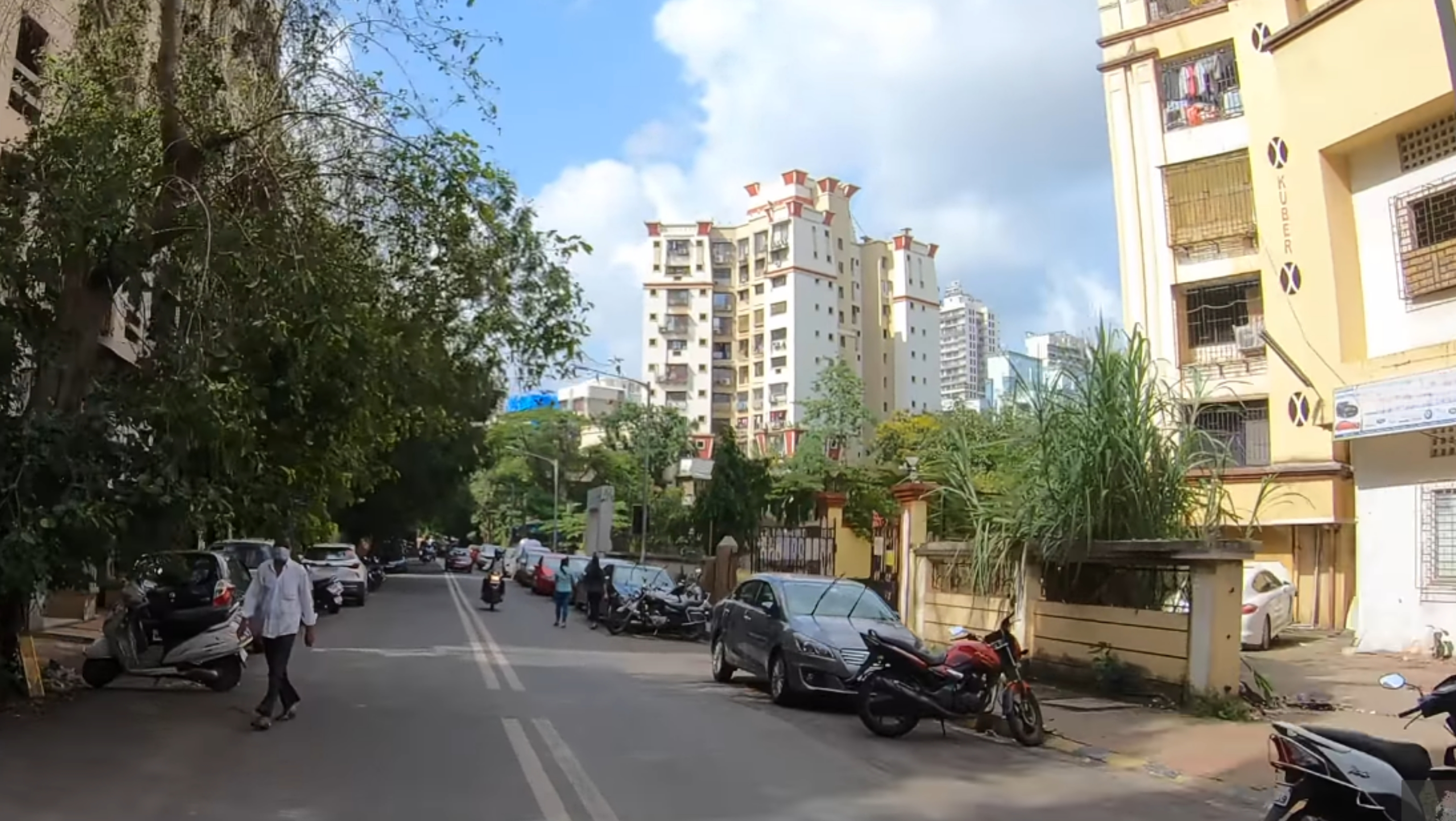
- From top, Gandhinagar main road, Gandhinagar residential area

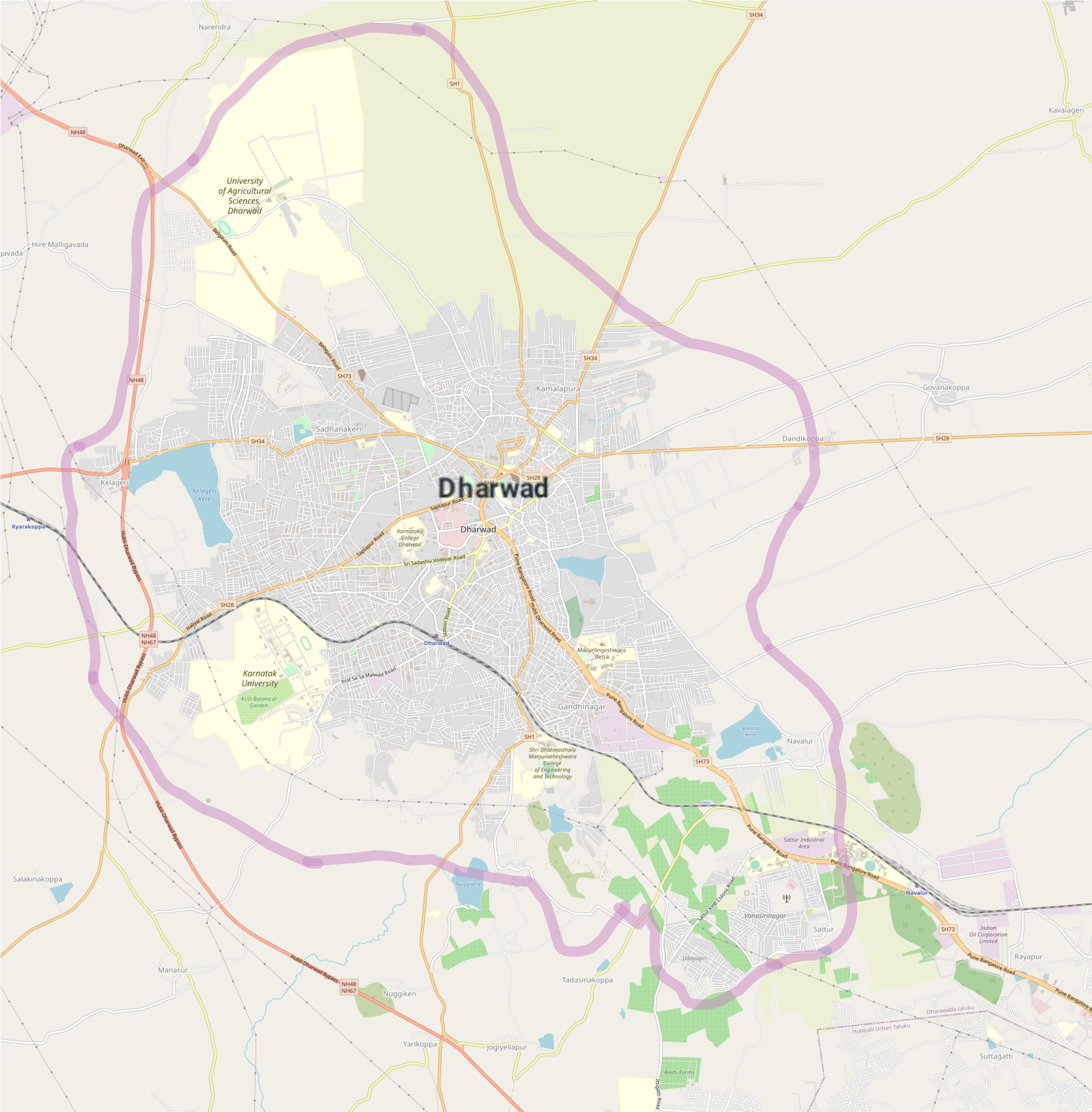
- Location in Dharwad Gandhinagar (Karnataka) Gandhinagar (India)
- Coordinates: 15.435°N 75.018°E
- Country: India
- State: Karnataka
- Metro: Dharwad

Government
  - Type: Municipal corporation
  - Body: Hubli-Dharwad Municipal Corporation
- Elevation: 738 m (2,421 ft)

Population
  - Total: 32,201

Languages
  - Official: Kannada
- Time zone: UTC+5:30 (IST)
- PIN: 580004
- Area code: 0836
- Vehicle registration: KA-25
- Lok Sabha constituency: Dharwad (Lok Sabha constituency)
- Planning agency: Hubballi-Dharwad Urban Development Authority
- Rapid Transit: Hubballi-Dharwad Bus Rapid Transit System

Gandhinagar is an established upmarket residential area located in the south of Dharwad conurbation,India named after prominent Indian leader Mahatma Gandhi. It is located in proximity to Malmaddi and some Deccan areas of the city. Gandhinagar is the commercial centre of Dharwad city.

== Location ==
Gandhinagar is located south east of Dharwad city which is 21 kilometres away from the city of Hubballi, The nearest railway station is Dharwad railway station in Malmaddi.

== Localities ==
Gandhinagar consists of few smaller localities, Rajatgiri is the largest residential locality located in Gandhinagar it is a vast residential and commercial area adjacent to Saraswatpur. The other localities are Haripriya Colony and Dhavalgiri in the south.

== Transport ==
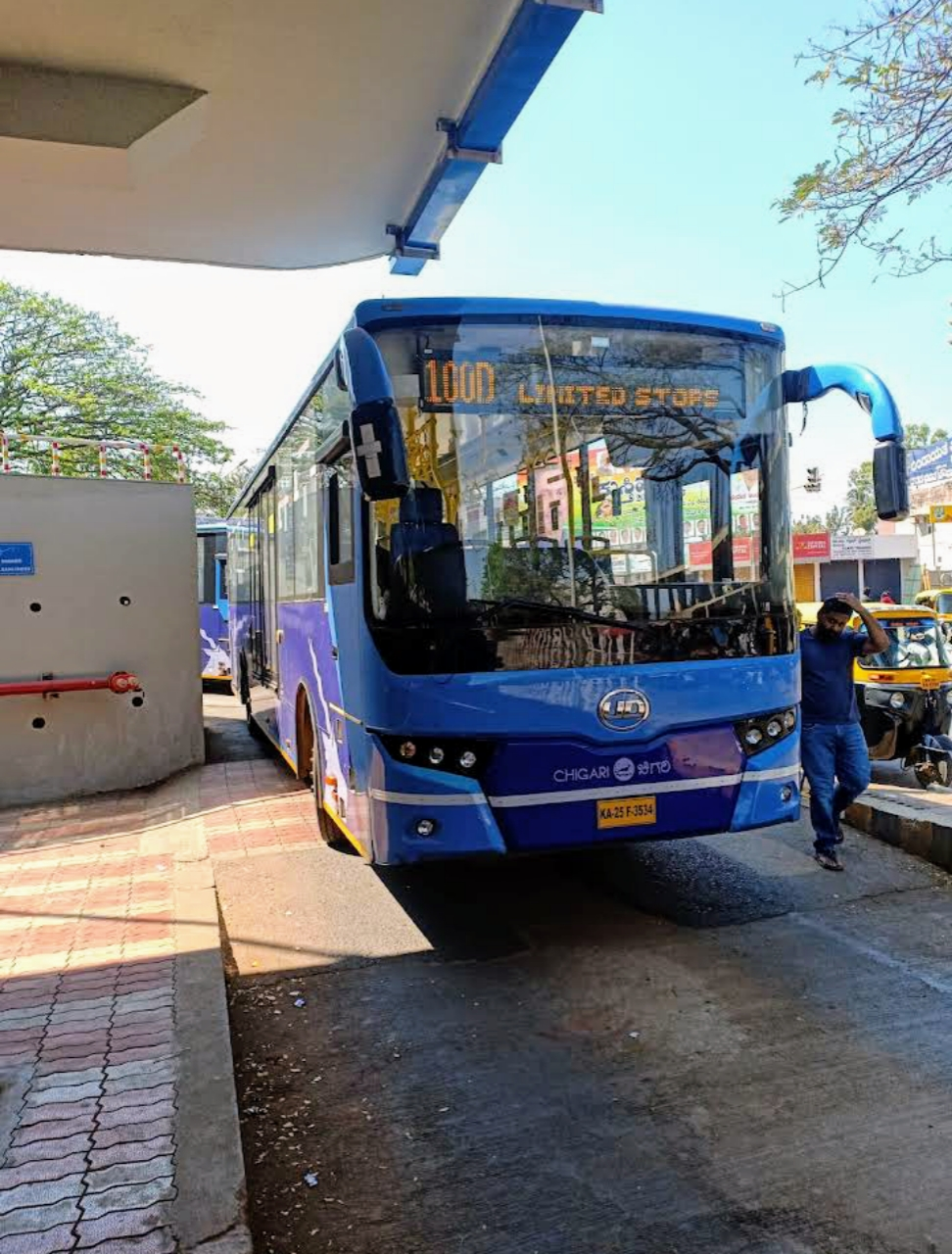
BRTS bus

Gandhinagar is well connected to Hubli-Dharwad Bus Rapid Transit System (HDBRTS) (Rapid transit) it is one of the stations of the HDBRTS corridor and one of the busiest BRTS stations in Dharwad during working days.

In December 2022 Gandhinagar was connected to BRTS feeder buses named 'Chigari Samparka' on basis, NWKRTC has started operating feeder buses between Navanagar (Hubli) to Gandhinagar.

The nearest railway station to Gandhinagar is Dharwad railway station which is approximately 4 km (2.5 mi) and Navalur railway station is about 5.2 km (3.2 mi) far.

== See also ==
- Dharwad railway station
- Malmaddi
- Saraswatpur
