= Gandhinagar Assembly constituency =

Gandhinagar Assembly constituency or Gandhi Nagar Assembly constituency may refer to the following constituencies in India:

- Gandhinagar, Jammu and Kashmir Assembly constituency
- Gandhinagar North Assembly constituency, in Gujarat
- Gandhinagar South Assembly constituency, in Gujarat
- Gandhi Nagar, Delhi Assembly constituency
- Gandhinagar, Rajasthan Assembly constituency
- Gandhi Nagar, Karnataka Assembly constituency

== See also ==
- Gandhinagar (disambiguation)
