= Gandhi Nagar, Sindhanur =

Gandhinagar Gandhinagar Jalihal Camp
- village
- Location in Karnataka, India Gandhinagar (India)
- Coordinates: 15°41′49″N 76°39′53″E
- Country: India
- State: Karnataka
- District: Raichur

Population (2011)
  - Total: 10,568

Languages
  - Official: Kannada
- Time zone: UTC+5:30 (IST)
- PIN: 584128
- Telephone code: 08535
- Vehicle registration: KA-36
- Sex ratio: 1000:985 ♂/♀
- Lok Sabha constituency: Koppala

Gandhinagar formerly known as Jalihal Camp, is one of the largest villages in Karnataka state in terms of area, population, property, agricultural production and revenue. It is the first government recognized revenue village in the Tunga Bhadra Delta Region (i.e. Bellary, Raichur and Koppal districts). From 17 May 1997 onward, this village was renamed Gandhi Nagar from Jalihal Camp. is located on either sides of Tunga bhadra left Bank Canal,#36. In this village, there are many fertile, high-yielding paddy fields. Paddy is the main agricultural crop in the Tunga Bhadra Delta Region and the paddy varieties grown here include: Sonamasuri, Emergency, Ganga Kaveri, Nellore Sona, JJL, RS22.

The paddy grown here were mainly exported to Bengaluru, Chennai, Maharashtra and Middle-East countries. The paddy cultivation is done by using modern agricultural equipment; most of the farmers have their own tractor. The residents mainly established cow and buffalo farms alongside the paddy fields.

In this village, there are many Telugu-speaking people, who mainly migrated from West Godhavari District of Andhra Pradesh during the 1960s and 1970s for cultivating agricultural land in the Tunga Bhadra delta region. These people are mainly from the Kamma and Rajulu communities and their primary occupation is agriculture and animal husbandry. Telugu constitute the majority of the villagers and farmers.

Kamma people, also known as Chowdaries, form the base of Gandhinagar's economy.

== Places ==
Gandhinagar has lot of temples to visit, most notably Lord Shiva Temple because of its architectural design. This temple was built from funds donated by people of Gandhi Nagar and neighboring villages and towns. Telugu film Actors Muralimohan, Srikanth and Aahuthi Prasad are also contributed funds for its construction. The main people involved in activities for its construction were Veerampalam Siddanthi and Sri Maddhipati Gangadhar Rao.

The following is the list of temples:

1. Shivalayam (Annapoorna Vishalakshi sametha vishveshwara panchayathana kshethram)
2. Shiridi Sai Baba Temples(2)
3. Ramalayam Temple
4. Subbramanyam Swami Temple
5. Lord Vinayaka Temple
6. Lord Anjaneya Temple
7. Durgamma Temple
8. Thayamma Temple
9. Sri Renuka Yallamma temple
10.Sri Grama devi temple

== Education ==
The following are schools located in Gandhi Nagar(R):

1. Tagore Telugu Medium School high school
2. Sarvepalli RadhaKrishna Education Trust's Vishvashanthi Vidhyanikethan
3. Govt Kannada Medium School
4. Monalisa English Medium School
5. Sri Manjunath school
6. Shree Gurusiddeshwar High School

== Geography ==
Gandhinagar is located at 15°41′49″N 76°39′53″E. It lies on the banks of Tunga Bhadra Left Bank Canal, #36 and the nearest town is Sindhanur, a distance of 12 km. Its taluk headquarters is Sindhanur and district headquarters in Raichur.

== Gallery ==
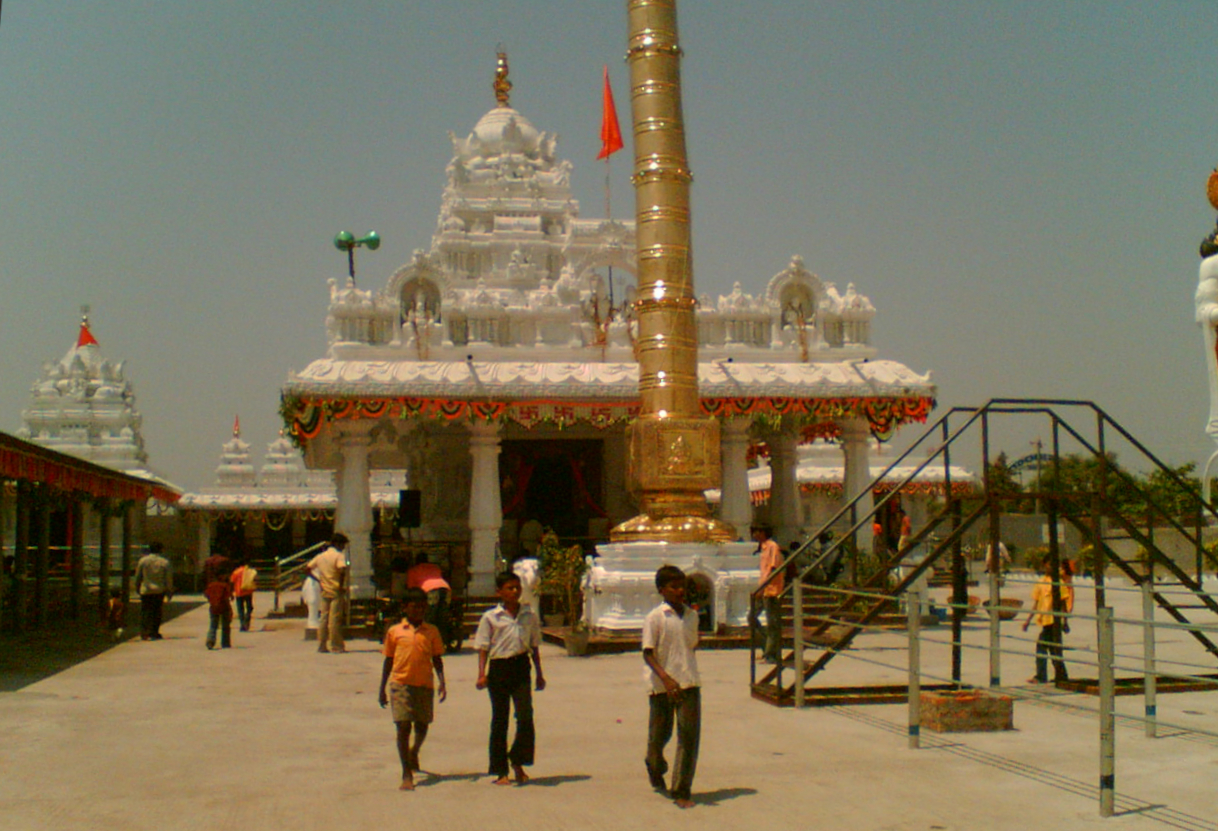
Lord Shiva Temple front view.

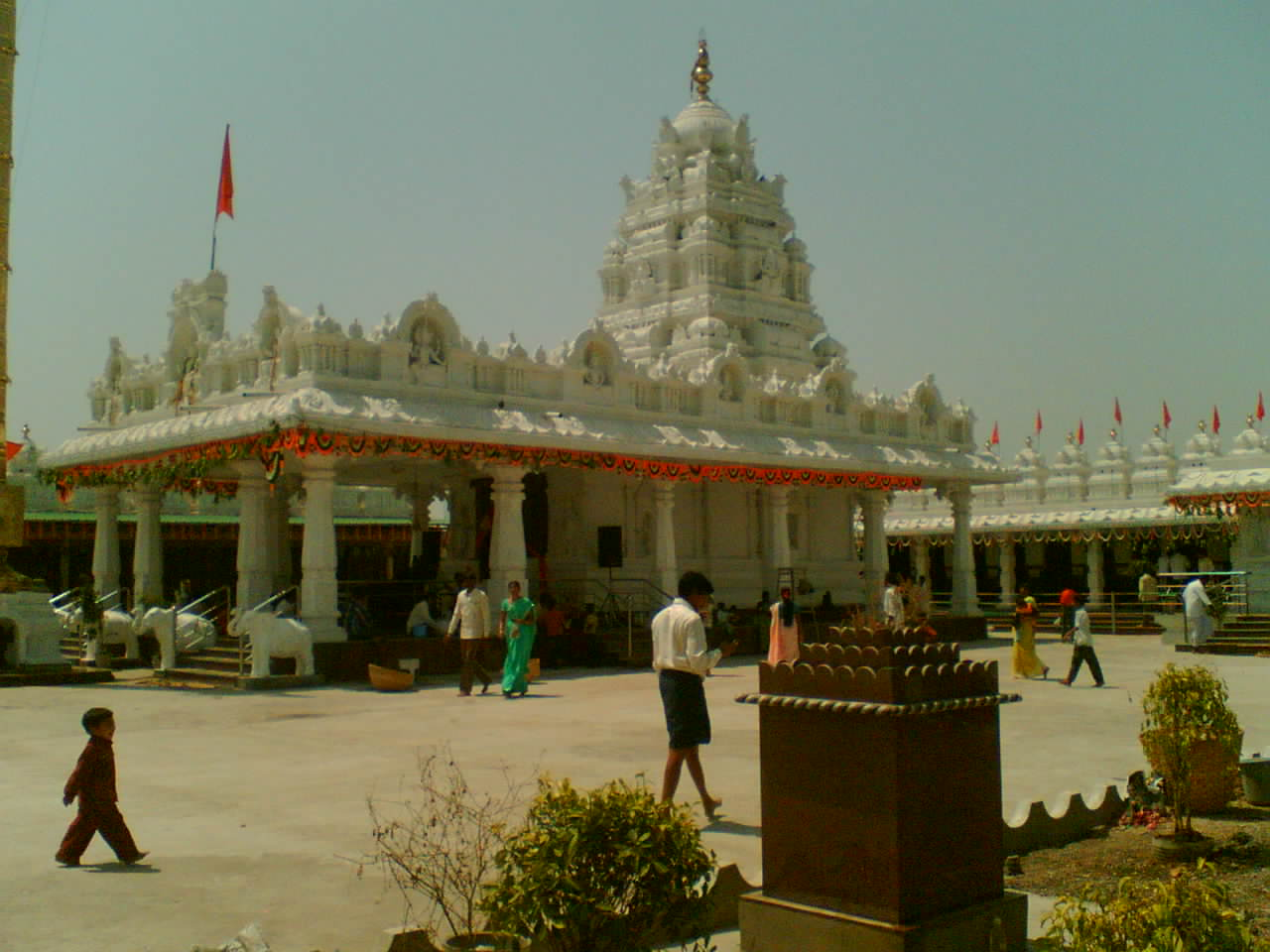
Lord Shiva Temple side view.

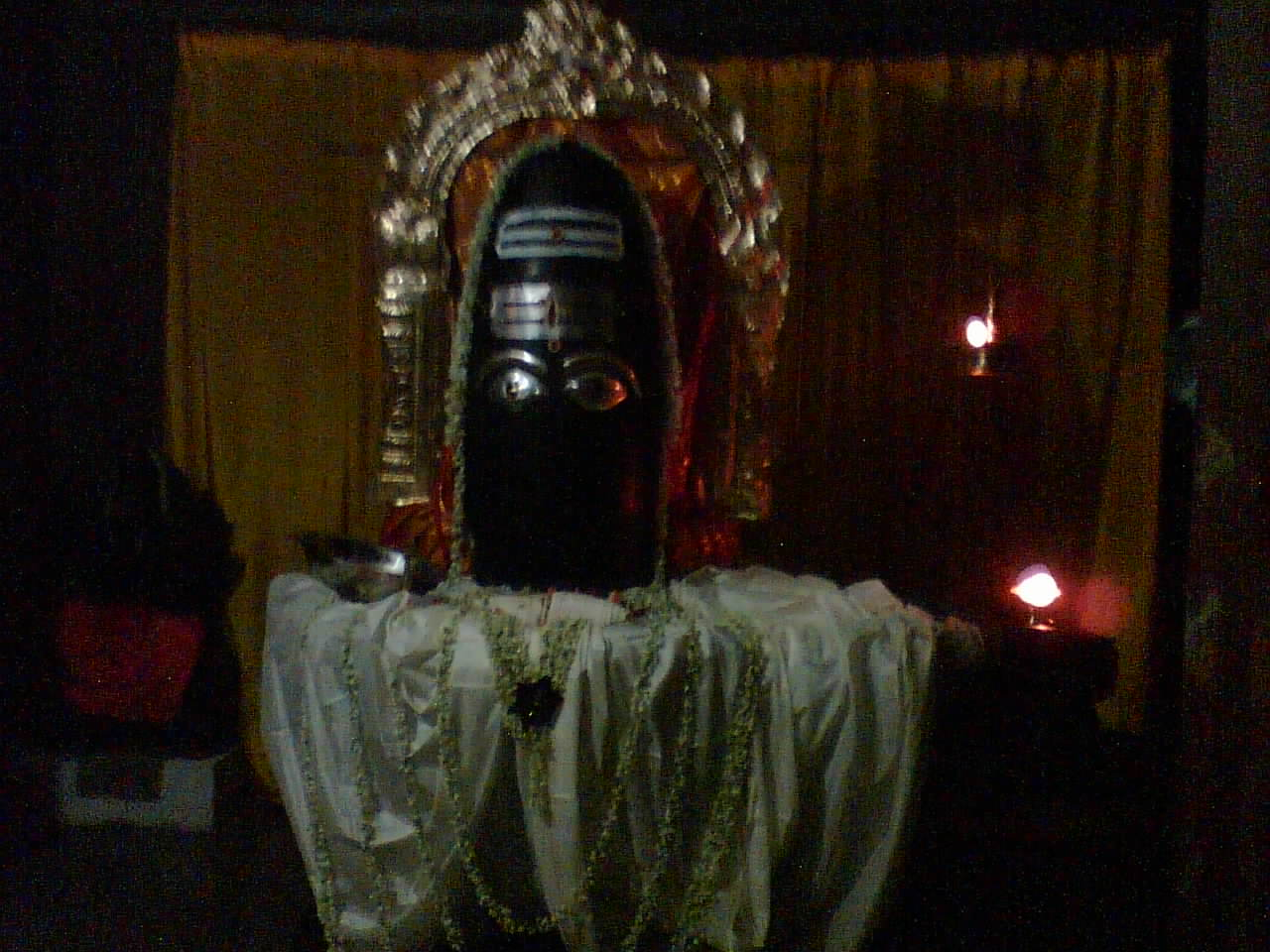
Idol of Lord Shiva in the main temple of Shivalayam.

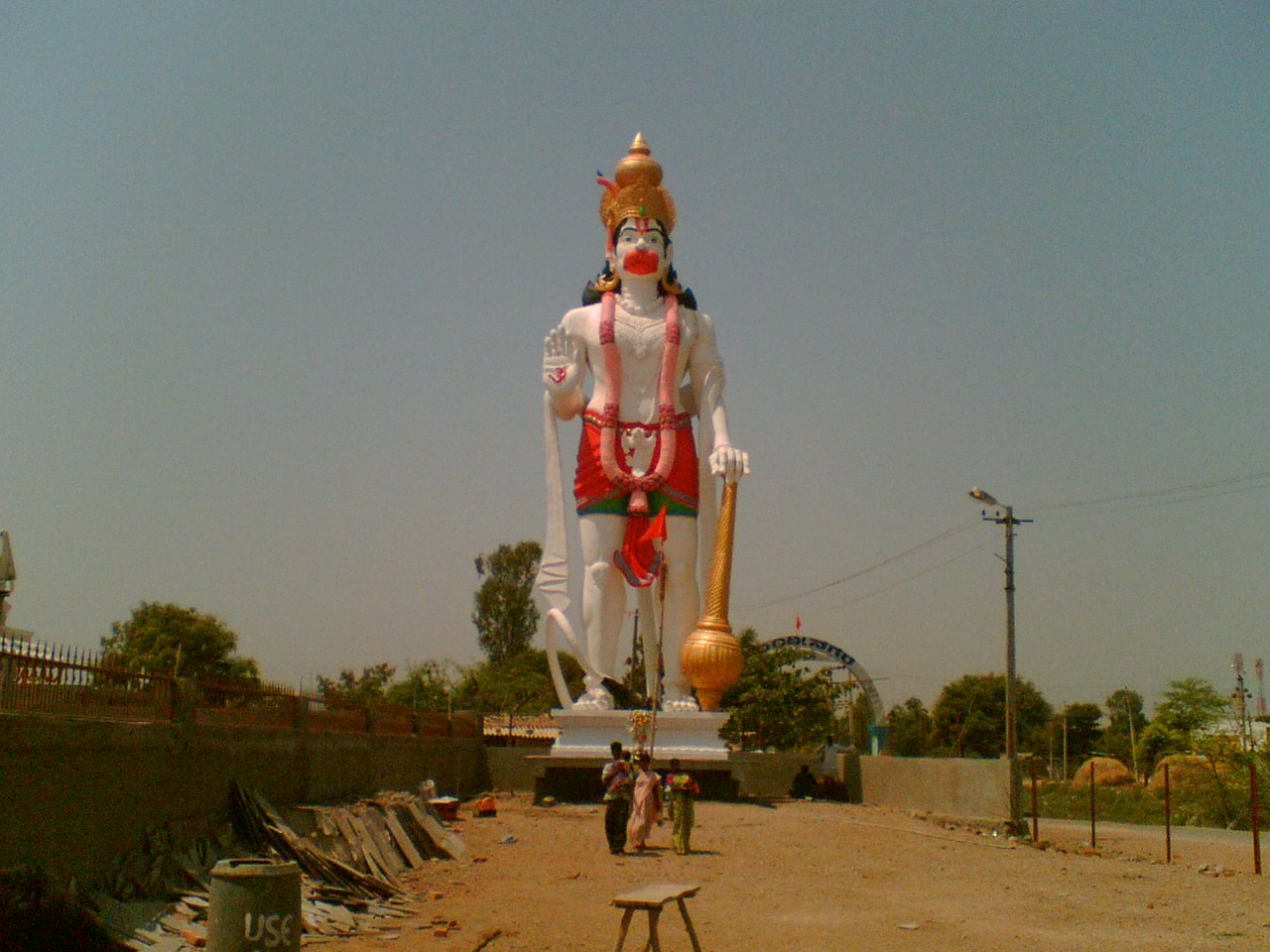
This is the statue of Lord Hanuman which is just beside the Shivalayam temple and its height is 22 meters.

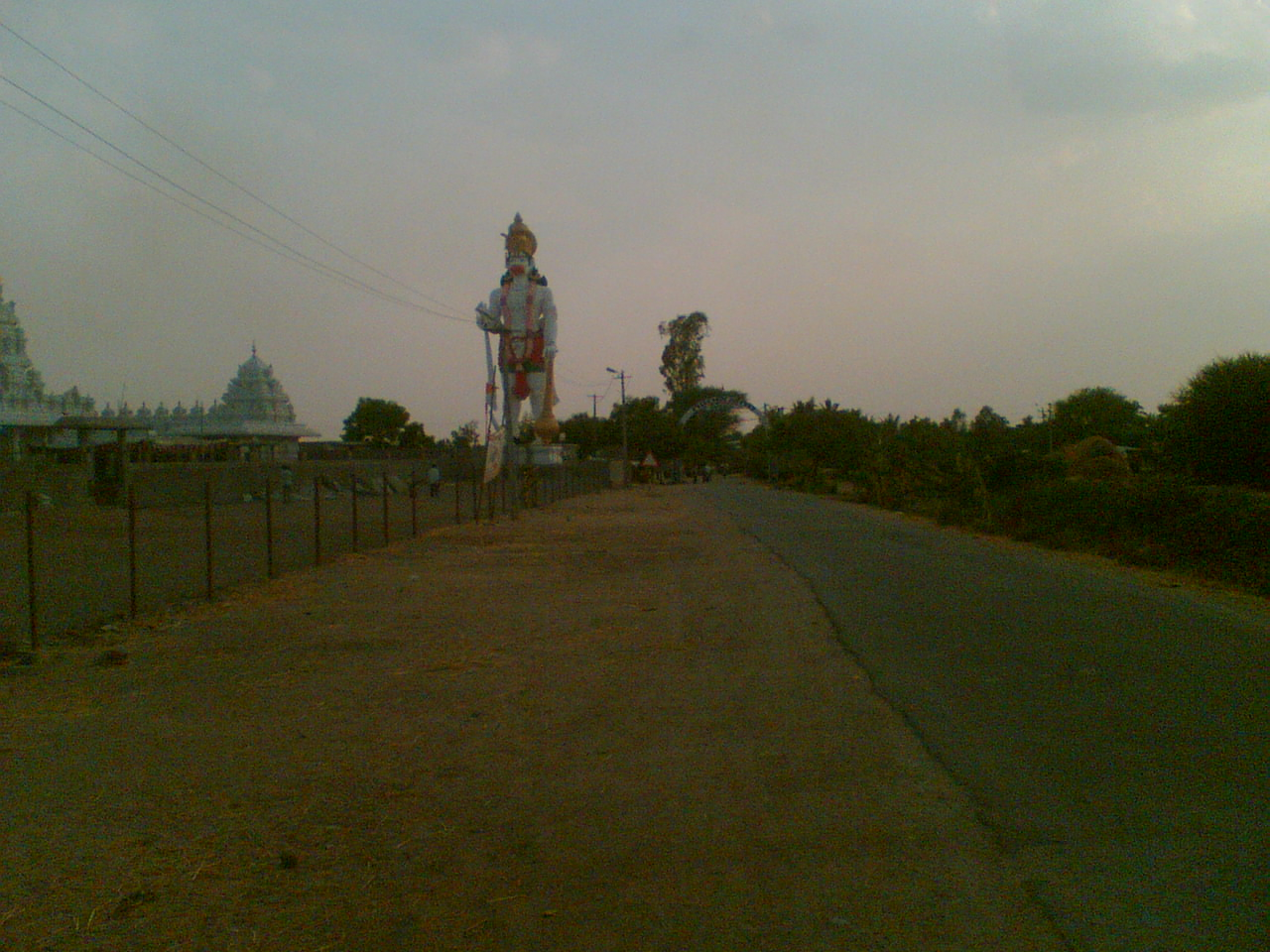
A view of Shivalayam Temple from the main road of Gandhi Nagar.

A view of Shivalayam Temple.
