= Malmaddi =

Malamaddi Malamaddi Malamaddi
- Neighborhood
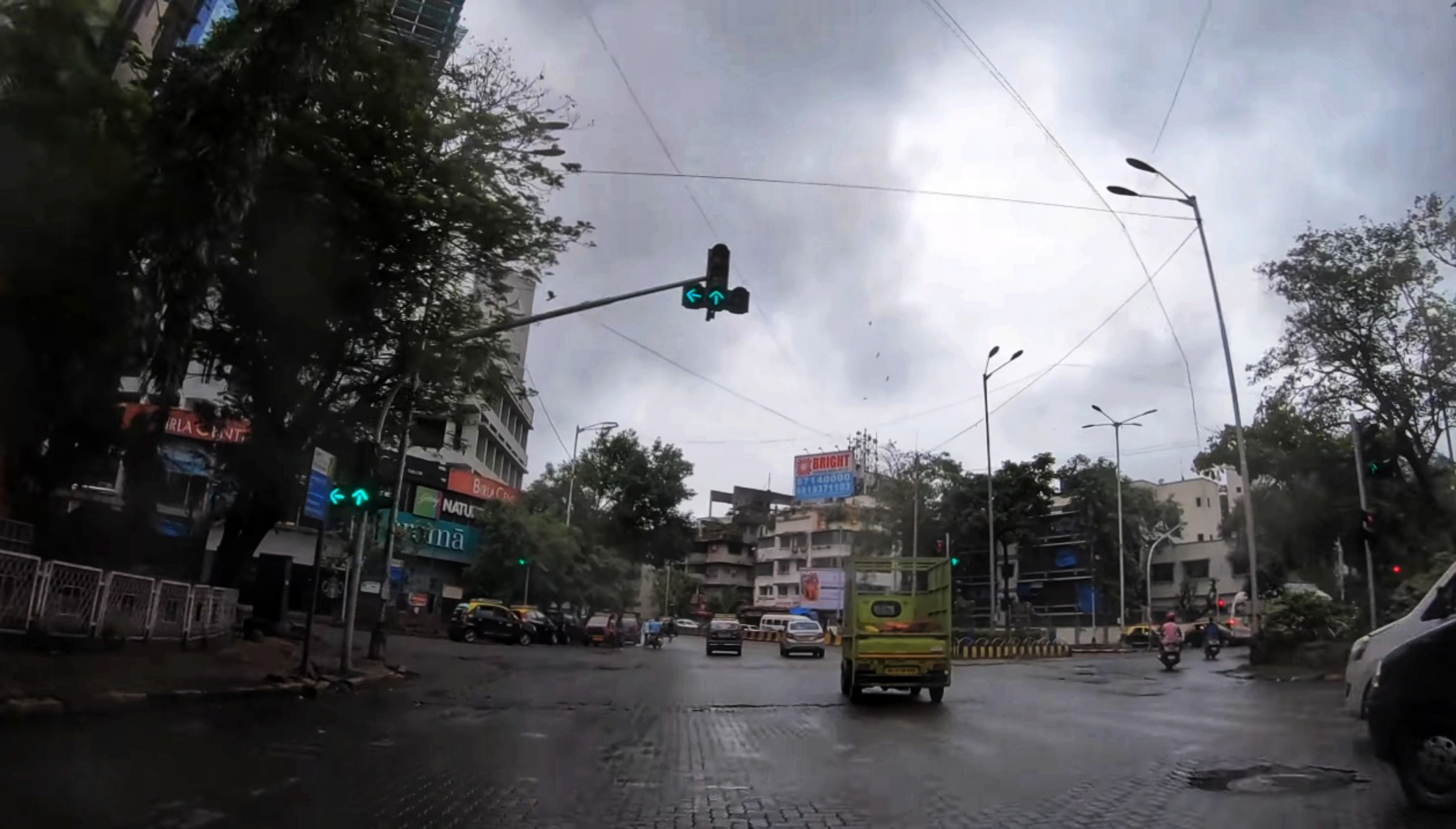
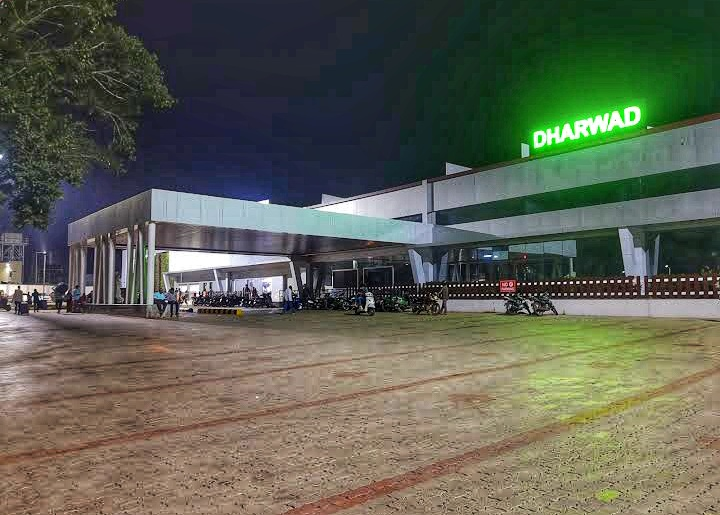
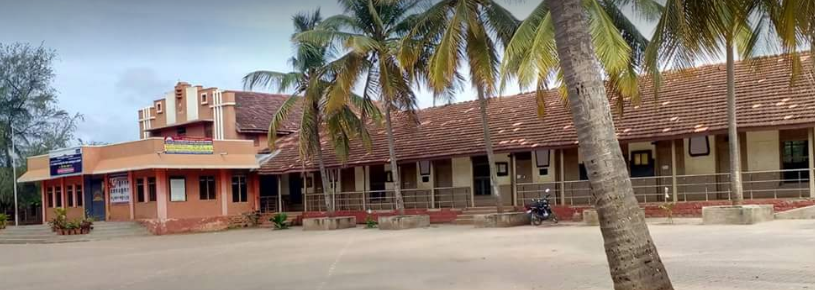
- Railway station road, Dharwad railway station, K E Board primary school
- Nickname: Malamaddi
- Location in Karnataka, India
- Coordinates: 15.451°N 75.003°E
- Country: India
- State: Karnataka
- Metro: Dharwad

Government
  - Type: Municipal Corporation
  - Body: Hubli-Dharwad Municipal Corporation

Languages
  - Official: Kannada
- Time zone: UTC+5:30 (IST)
- PIN: 580001 (Malmaddi North) & 580002 (Malmaddi South East)
- Vehicle registration: KA25
- Lok Sabha constituency: Dharwad (Lok Sabha constituency)
- Planning agency: Hubli–Dharwad Urban Development Authority

Malamaddi is a residential area in the city of Dharwad, in the Indian state of Karnataka. It is located near the Dharwad city railway station. The area is mainly middle-class. It was developed for independent houses (bungalows) with a courtyard and kitchen garden. This type of layout led to friendship among dwellers and harmony, where people used to know not only neighbours, but the entire locality.

MaLa in Kannada means "place above normal level" and maddi in Kannada means "a hillock", a small hill. The two words together refer to the location of Malamaddi on a small hill above the normal elevations in Dharwad. Religious institutions such as Rayara Mutt and Uttaradi Mutt are located there.

Malmaddi is home to K.E. Board Primary and High School, as well as two hospitals: Chirayu Multi-Specialty Hospital and Prashanth Hospital and one Homeopathy Clinic: Asian Homeocare.

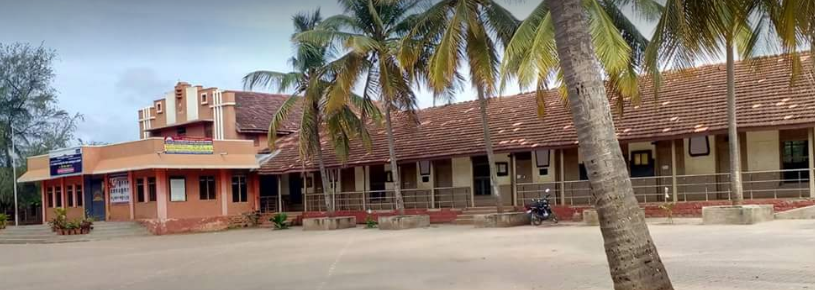
K E Board High School

== Educational centers ==
- Hindi Prachar Sabha
- Basel Mission English medium high school
- Basel Mission girls high school
- Rajiv Gandhi English medium high school
- Rajiv Gandhi Vidyalaya (CBSE)
- KEBoard's English medium primary school
- KEBoard's Kannada & English medium school of State & CBSE
- Government primary school no. 11
- Smart school junior
- KPSE High School
- K Rubdi English medium Nursery & Kindergarten school
- Dr. Rudolf Steiner's Education and welfare society
- Nidhivani college of Commerce

== Health Care ==
The list of health care centers/hospitals located in Malmaddi is provided below

- Asian Homeocare-Homeopathy Clinic
- Tavergeri Nusring Home pvt Ltd
- Amruth Nursing home
- Chirayu Multi-speciality Hospital
- District Government Ayurvedic Hospital (South Malmaddi near Saraswatpur)
- Dr. R.V Deshpande Health Clinic
- ESI Hospital (Near Toll Naka)

== Temples and religious places ==
1. Vanavasi Ram Mandir
2. Shri Hanuman Temple
3. Sita Ram Mandir
4. Ulavi Basaveshwara Mandir
