= Saraswatpur =

- Neighborhood
- Saraswatpur
- Location in Karnataka, India
- Coordinates: 15.4749°N 75.0078°E
- Country: India
- State: Karnataka

Languages
  - Official: Kannada
- Time zone: UTC+5:30 (IST)

Saraswatipur is a residential locality that is part of Dharwad city of Karnataka state, India. Saraswatpur is located on top of a hillock besotted with old bungalows and garden in front of them. Saraswatpur is near Malmaddi, another locality of Dharwad. The name is derived from a concentration of Saraswat Brahmins in the area. Saraswatpur has been developed into an urban locality in recent years. Being very close to some educational institution, as SDM College of Engineering and Technology, helped the rapid development of this place. Additionally, it is reasonably close to the centuries-old Dharwad Railway station. Famous personalities, such as Girish Karnad and Leena Chandavarkar, hail from this area. One of the Unit office of National Projects Construction Corporation Limited (KREIS North Unit) used to stand there.
