= Dharwad railway station =

Railway station in Dharwad, India

Dharwad Dharwar
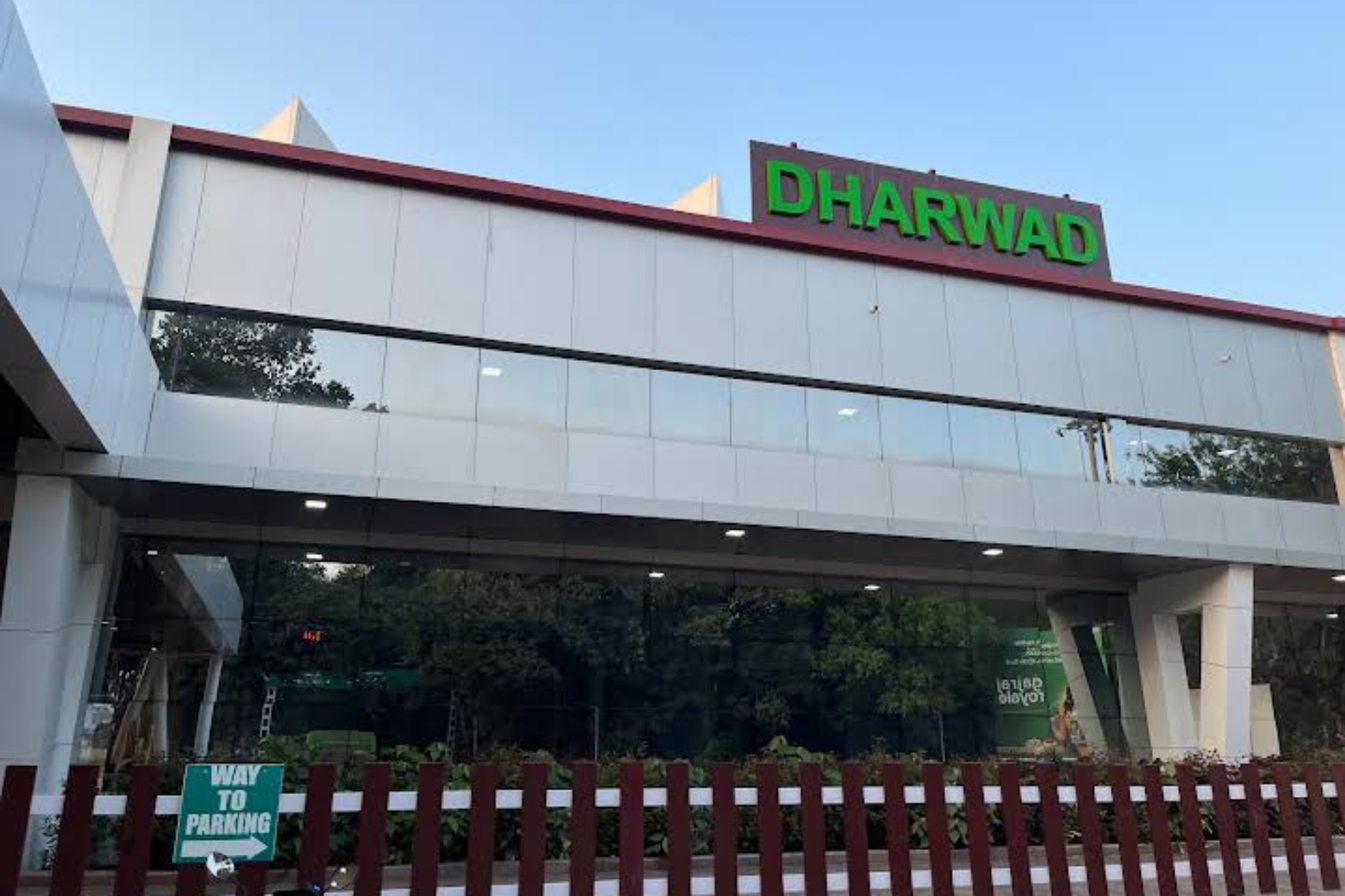
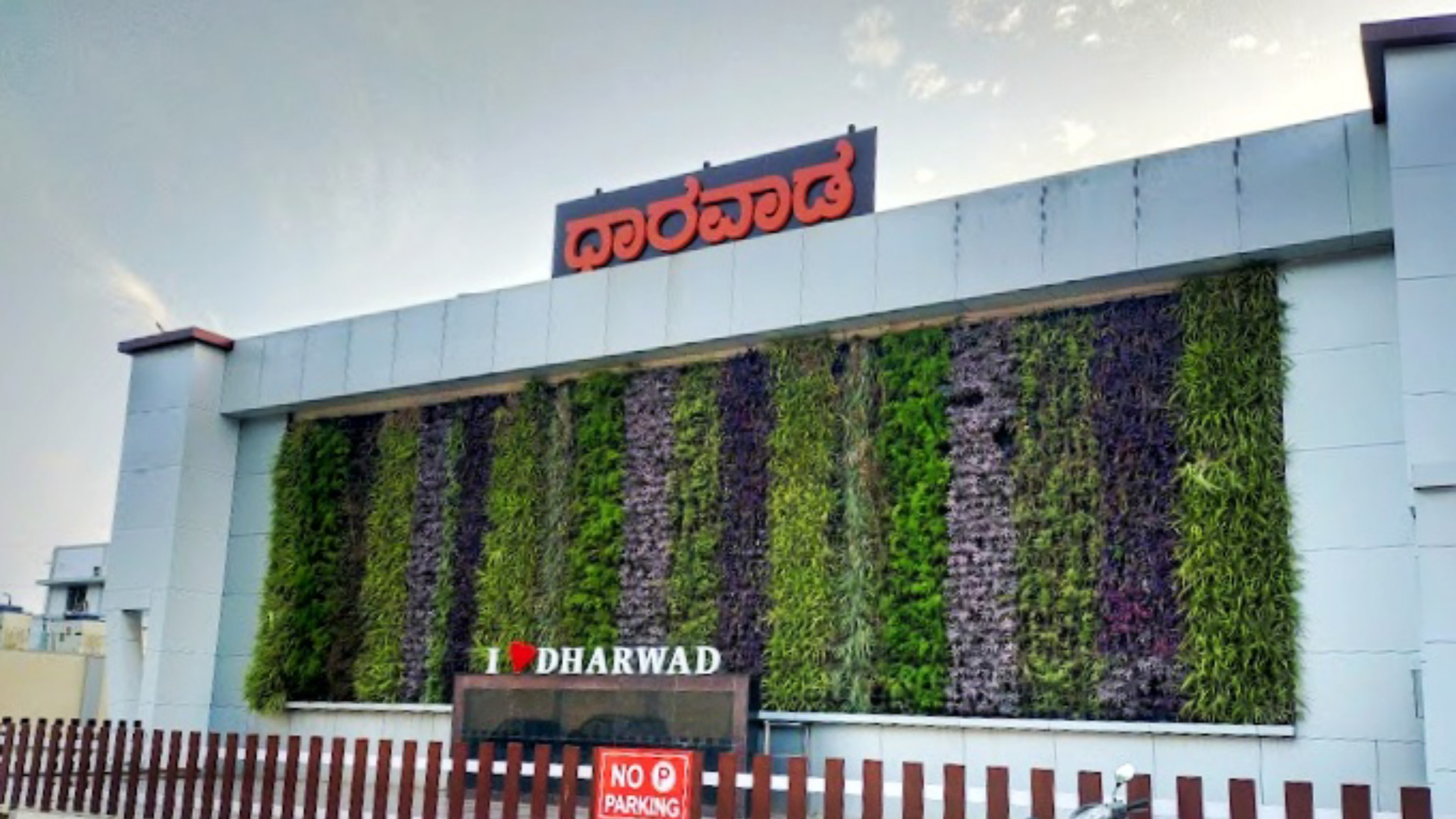
- From top, Main entrance of Dharwad city railway station, Vertical garden

General information
- Location: Railway station road, Malmaddi, Dharwad, Karnataka; India
- Coordinates: 15.441°N 75.004°E
- Elevation: 735 m (2,411 ft)
- System: Express train, Passenger train, Commuter rail and Goods railway station
- Owner: Indian Railways
- Operator: South Western Railway
- Lines: Dharwad–Hubli–Miraj lineline Chennai Central–Dharwad line Mysore–Dharwad line Guntakal–Dharwad
- Platforms: 4
- Tracks: 8
- Connections: Hubli-Dharwad Bus Rapid Transit System bus taxi stand auto stand

Construction
- Structure type: Standard (on-ground station)
- Parking: Available
- Cycle facilities: Available
- Accessible: Disabled access

Other information
- Status: Functioning
- Station code: DWR
- Fare zone: South Western Railway zone

History
- Opened: 1920
- Closed: No
- Rebuilt: Yes completed in 2020
- Former names: Dharwar

Passengers
- Minimum. 9127 passengers per day (as of 2016)
- Computerized Ticketing Counters Luggage Checking System Parking Disabled Access Food Plaza Kiosks WC Taxi Stand Public Transportation
Location
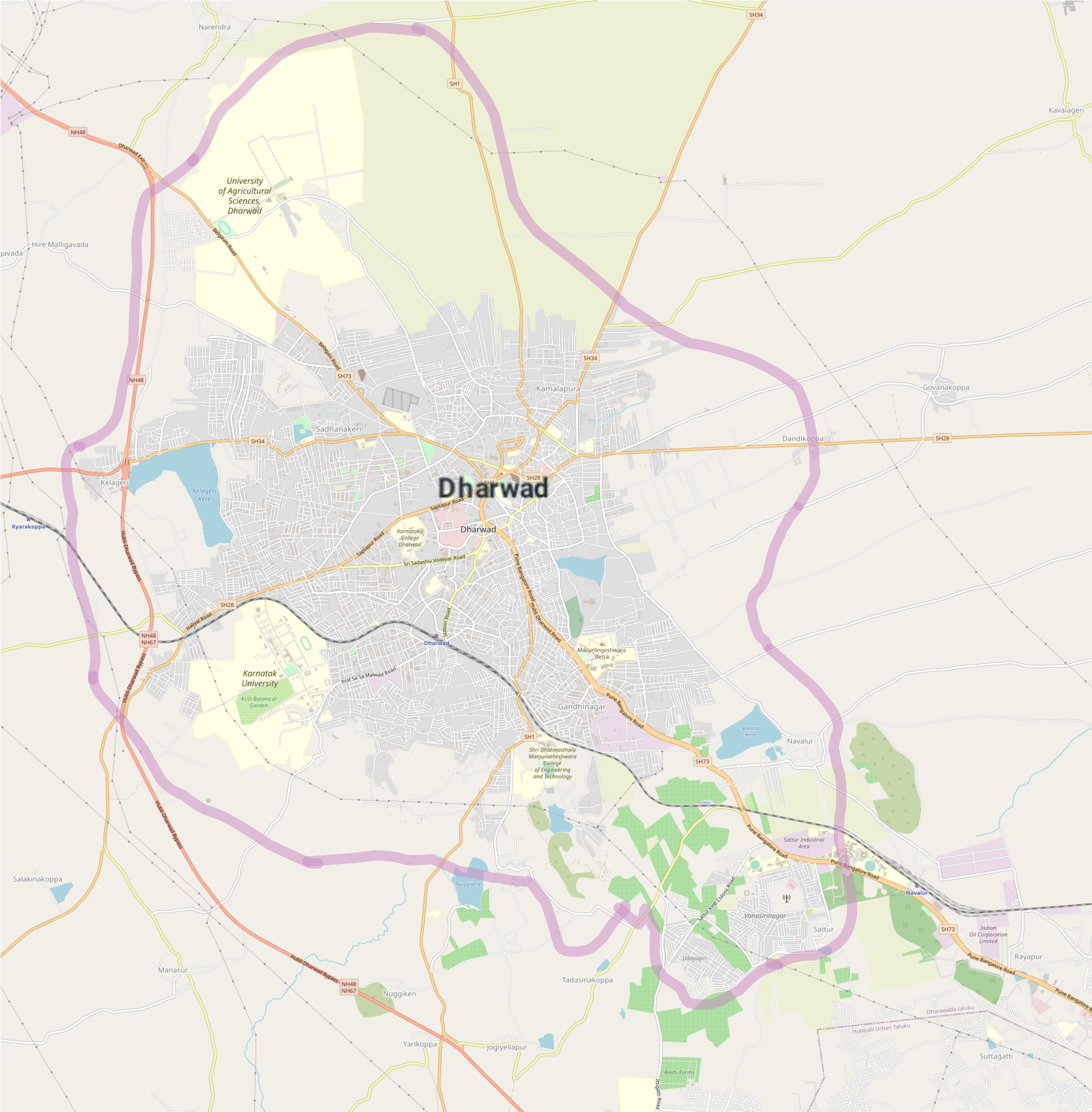
- Location within Dharwad Location within Karnataka Location within India
- Interactive map

Dharwad railway station formerly known as Dharwar railway station (station code: DWR) is a major station under Hubli railway division of South Western Railway zone of Indian Railways situated in Dharwad, Karnataka. It is in top 10 station in South Western Railway (SWR). It is one of the busiest railway station in the state. The new railway station was completed and inaugurated in October 2022 by Railway Minister.

== Services ==
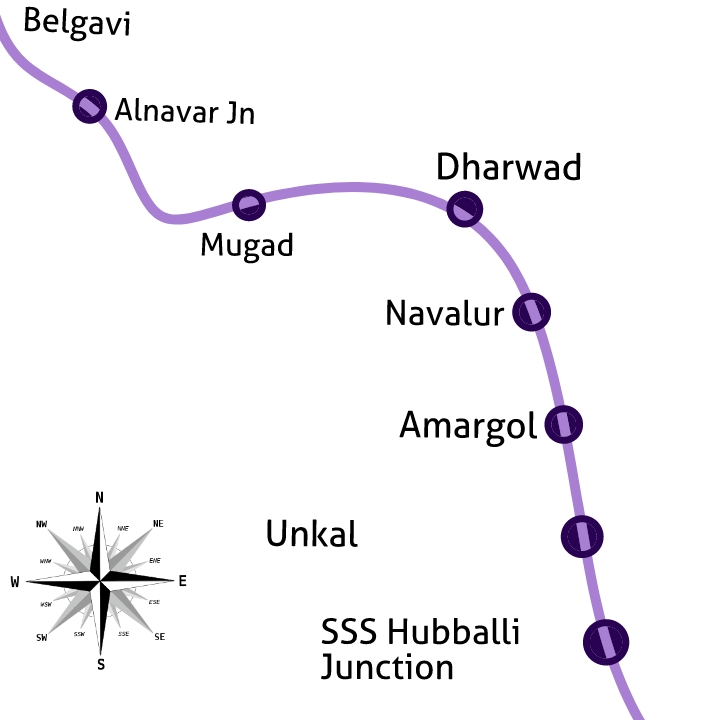
Dharwad region railway schematic map

Dharwad is well connected to Hubballi, Belgaum, Bangalore, Mumbai, Pune, Gadag, Bagalkot, Bijapur, Solapur, Bellary, Davangere, Delhi, Visakhapatnam, Hyderabad, Ahmedabad, Vijayawada, Mysore, Tirupati and Manmad by daily trains to Chennai, Howrah and Thiruvananthapuram.

== Line ==
Dharwad railway station is part of Guntakal–Vasco da Gama section HDN-7A Doubling

Dharwad railway station code and helpline numbers details

== See also ==
- Hubli Junction railway station
- Hubli Airport
- Hubli-Dharwad Bus Rapid Transit System
- Konkan Railway Corporation
