= Gandhinagar, Palghar =

Village in Maharashtra

Gandhinagar
- village
- Location in Maharashtra, India Gandhinagar (India)
- Coordinates: 20.1018539°N 72.9755829°E
- Country: India
- State: Maharashtra
- District: Palghar
- Taluka: Talasari
- Elevation: 135 m (443 ft)

Population (2011)
  - Total: 2,590
- Time zone: UTC+5:30 (IST)
- 2011 census code: 551573

Gandhinagar is a village in the Palghar district of Maharashtra, India. It is located in the Talasari taluka.

== Demographics ==
According to the 2011 census of India, Gandhinagar has 494 households. The effective literacy rate (i.e. the literacy rate of population excluding children aged 6 and below) is 56.3%.

Demographics (2011 Census)
	Total	Male	Female
Population	2590	1277	1313
Children aged below 6 years	430	204	226
Scheduled caste	0	0	0
Scheduled tribe	2558	1258	1300
Literates	1216	751	465
Workers (all)	1284	688	596
Main workers (total)	1061	579	482
Main workers: Cultivators	619	338	281
Main workers: Agricultural labourers	255	122	133
Main workers: Household industry workers	6	1	5
Main workers: Other	181	118	63
Marginal workers (total)	223	109	114
Marginal workers: Cultivators	17	13	4
Marginal workers: Agricultural labourers	130	50	80
Marginal workers: Household industry workers	0	0	0
Marginal workers: Others	76	46	30
Non-workers	1306	589	717
