= Hubli-Dharwad Bus Rapid Transit System =

Bus system in Hubballi and Dharwad, India

Hubali-Dharwad Bus Rapid Transit System Hubbaḷḷi-Dhāravāḍa Bus Kṣipra Sārige Vyavasthe
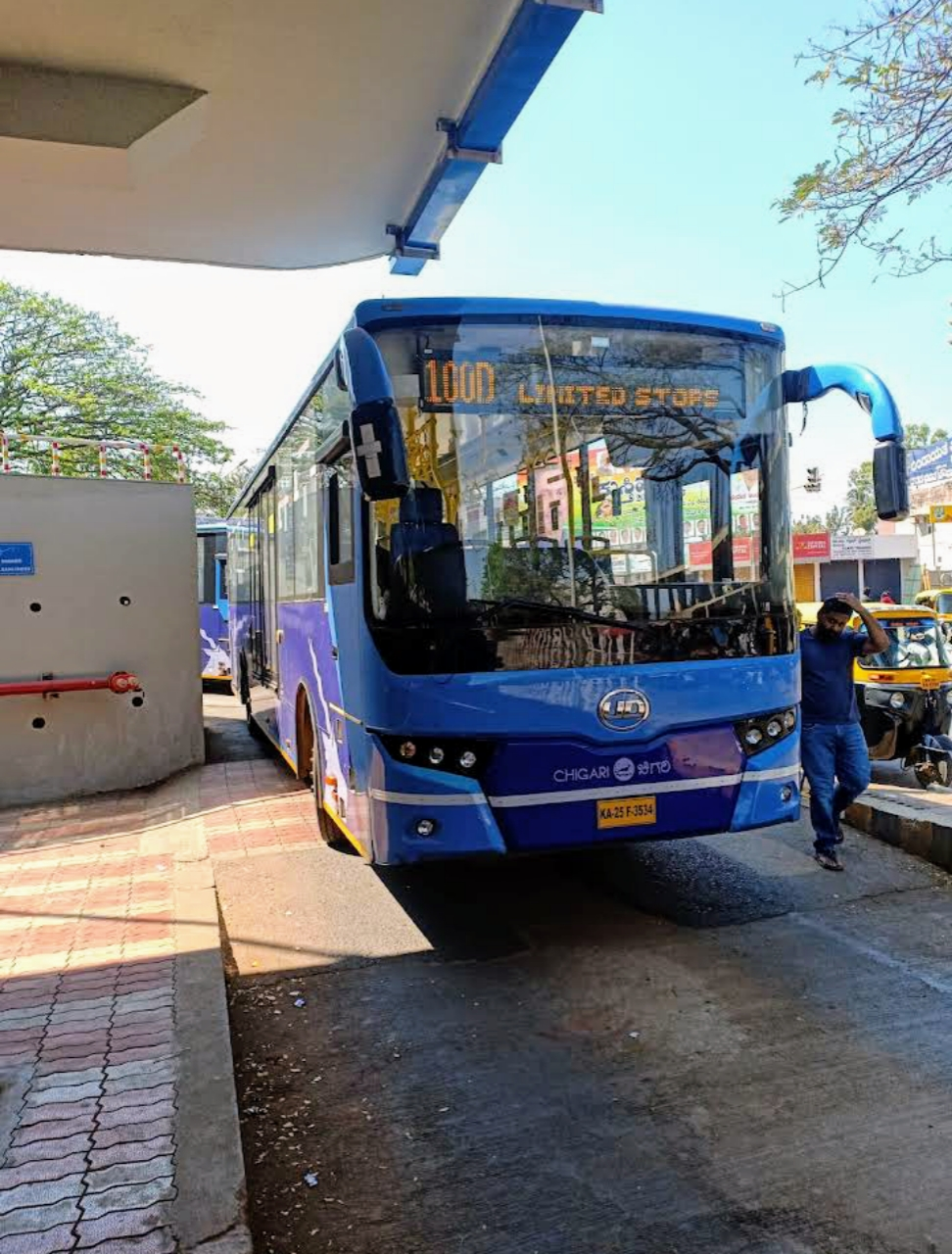
- HDBRTS Chigari bus in Dharwad

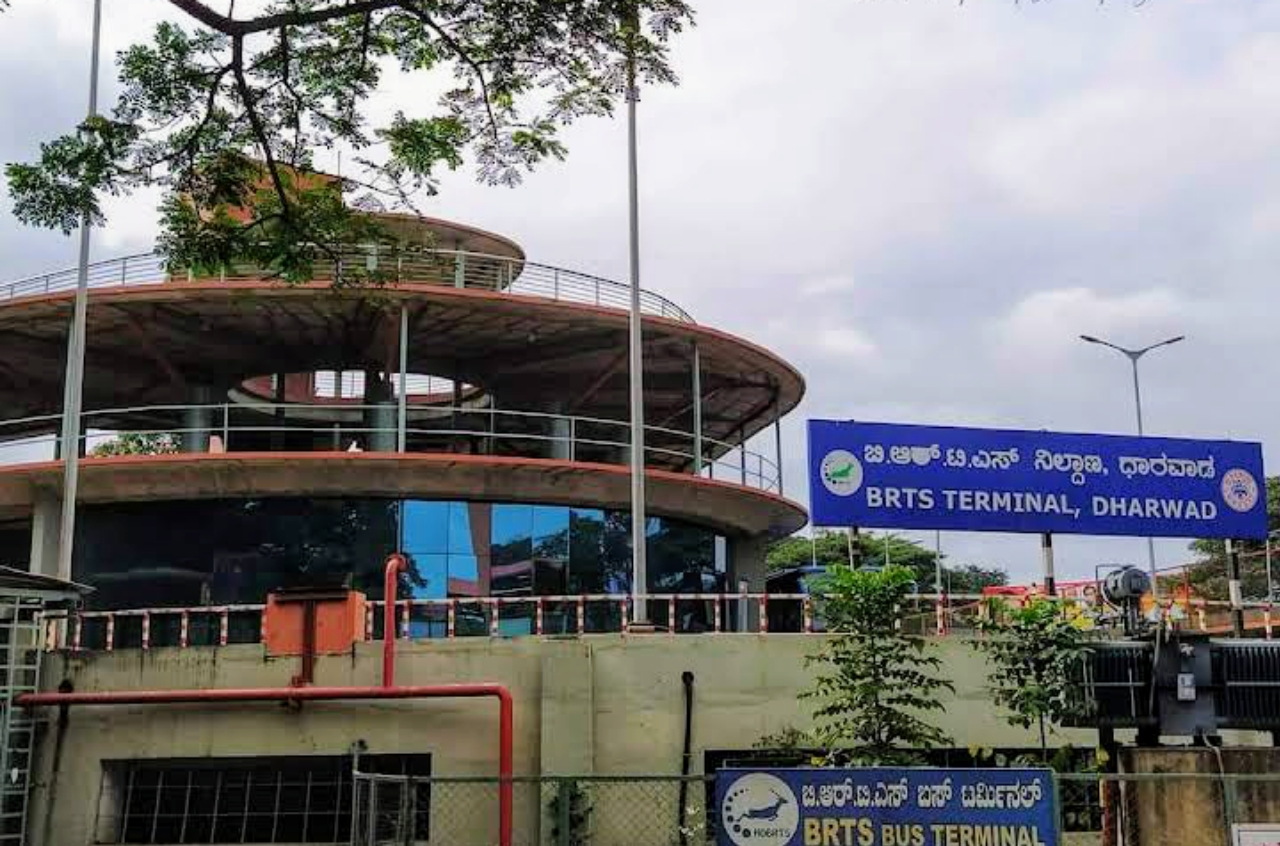
- BRTS Terminal Dharwad

Overview
- Area served: Hubballi-Dharwad
- Locale: Hubballi-Dharwad, Karnataka, India
- Transit type: Bus rapid transit
- Number of lines: 6 (trunk and feeder)
- Number of stations: 35
- Daily ridership: 100,000
- Website: www.hdbrts.com

Operation
- Began operation: 2 October 2018; 8 years ago
- Operator: Hubballi–Dharwad BRTS Company Ltd
- Number of vehicles: 100

Technical
- System length: 22 kilometres (14 mi) (70 km proposed)

Hubli-Dharwad Bus Rapid Transit System (HDBRTS), locally known as Chigari Bus, is a bus rapid transit system built to serve the twin cities of Hubali and Dharwad, located in the North-Western part of Karnataka state in India. It is a Government of Karnataka initiative to foster long-term economic growth in the region. The project promotes public transportation between the twin cities and aims to reduce congestion and air pollution in the region.

The 22.5 km (14.0 mi) dedicated BRT corridor connects Hubali and Dharwad. This system will not only transport 17500 (1.75 lakh) daily passengers currently using the buses on this corridor but also provide an alternative for the private vehicle users travelling on this corridor.

The Hubali-Dharwad BRTS project was implemented as part of the Sustainable Urban Transport Project (SUTP) and funded by the Government of Karnataka, Ministry of Housing and Urban Affairs (MHUA), World Bank and Global Environment Facility (GEF). The total cost of the project is ₹970.87 crore (9.71 billion rs).

== Hubali-Dharwad BRTS Company Limited ==
The Hubali-Dharwad BRTS Company Ltd, a special purpose vehicle (SPV), is the nodal agency that implemented the BRT System. In addition to the managing director, the company also has four deputy general managers (Admin, Finance, Infrastructure, and Operations & ITS) and a chief security officer.

=== Board of directors ===
- Commissioner, Directorate of Urban Land Transport, Government of Karnataka - chairman of the board
- Deputy Commissioner, Dharwad
- Managing Director, NWKRTC
- Managing Director, KRDCL
- Managing Director, HDBRTS
- Commissioner of Police, Hubali-Dharwad Police
- Additional Commissioner, Department of Transport & Enf, North Zone, Dharwad
- Commissioner, HDMC
- Commissioner, HDUDA
- Chief Engineer, PWD, CAB, North Zone, Dharwad

== BRT corridor ==
The length of the Hubali-Dharwad BRTS corridor is 22.25 km (13.83 mi) from CBT Hubali to CBT–Dharwad with the width of the cross-sections ranging from 44m to 35m. The BRTS corridor includes segregated bus lanes, access-controlled bus stations, physical and fare integration with BRT feeder services. In addition, there is a system of off-board ticketing through smart cards and bar-coded paper tickets, an intelligent transport system and high-quality buses (Standard AC buses). The corridor has been designed for operating regular and express services. It consists of two lanes for BRTS buses on either side of the median bus station, facilitating overtaking lanes for express services. Foot bridges at six locations, Pelican signals, and synchronized signal management are proposed to facilitate the easy approach of passengers to bus stations.

== Bus stations ==
32 stations have been constructed on the median along the BRTS corridor. Based on the passenger load and interchange opportunity, there are seven three-bay bus stations and 24 two-bay bus stations.

== Buses ==
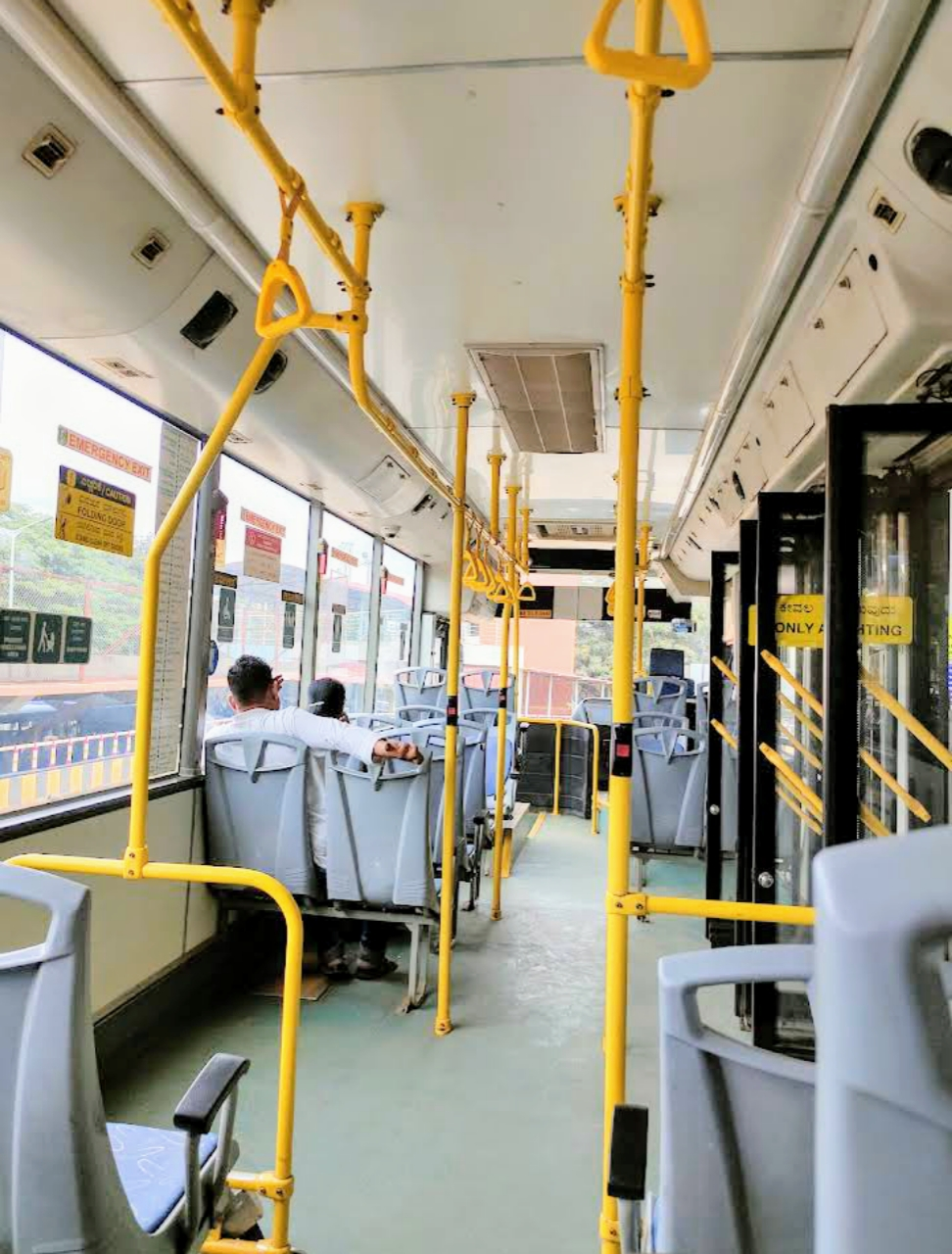
BRTS Dharwad bus interior

One hundred "Chigari" (ಚಿಗರಿ, meaning "Black buck" in Kannada), custom-built buses with violet livery, made by UD Trucks, buses division (a subsidiary of Isuzu, Japan), form the fleet of the Hubballi-Dharwad BRTS Company. HDBRTS system is the best of its kind in India, with premium 12 m AC buses to ensure passenger comfort and safety at an affordable rate. The BRT buses are BS-IV compliant, meeting UBS-II specifications, with a provision for wheelchairs and baby buggies. The buses are facilitated with on-board ITS for real-time passenger information, CCTV surveillance for safety and an announcement system. The bus has seating capacity of 37 + 1, with reservation for ladies (12), senior citizens (2) and specially-abled (2).

== Routes ==
Bus ID	Type	Route
200D-U	All stops	Hubballi Old Bus Station - Dharwad BRTS Terminal
201B-D	All stops	Dharwad New Bus Station - SSS Hubballi Junction Railway Station
201B-U	All stops	SSS Hubballi Junction Railway Station - Dharwad New Bus Station
200D-D	All stops	Dharwad BRTS Terminal - Hubballi Old Bus Station
200A-A	All stops	Dharwad BRTS Terminal - Hubballi City Bus Station
200A-U	All stops	Hubballi City Bus Station - Dharwad BRTS Terminal
100D-U	Limited stops	Hubballi Old Bus Station - Dharwad BRTS Terminal
100D-D	Limited stops	Dharwad BRTS Terminal - Hubballi Old Bus Station

== Timing ==
The BRTS buses run from morning 6 am to 11 midnight. The duty hours of the ticket-issuing staff at the BRTS stations end at 10 pm, after which, i.e., up to midnight, the passengers have to get the ticket from the conductor in the bus itself.

=== Frequency ===
No	Time	Frequency
1	6 am to 8:30 am	4 minutes
2	8:30 am to 12 pm	3 minutes
3	12 pm to 4 pm	25 minutes
4	4 pm to 8 pm	15 minutes
5	8 pm to 10 pm	5-6 minutes
6	10 pm to midnight	15 minutes

== Feeder buses ==
HDBRTS and NWKRTC started BRTS feeder buses named 'Chigari Samparka' on 16 December 2022. On a pilot basis, NWKRTC has started operating feeder buses between Sutagatti and Navanagar.

== Feeder bus routes ==
Route	Via
Navanagar/Sutagatti to Dharwad New Bus Stand	Karnataka Circle, Basaveshwara Circle (Navanagar), Cancer Hospital, Navanagar, RTO BRTS Station, Karnataka State Law University, Amar Nagar, Sutagatti
Sutagatti to Navanagar	Karnataka Circle, Basaveshwara Circle (Navanagar), Cancer Hospital, Navanagar, RTO BRTS Station, Karnataka State Law University, Amar Nagar, Sutagatti
Navanagar/Sutagatti to Gandhinagar, Dharwad	Karnataka Circle, Basaveshwara Circle (Navanagar), Cancer Hospital, Navanagar, RTO BRTS Station, Karnataka State Law University, Amar Nagar, Sutagatti
Navanagar/Sutagatti to SDM Hospital	Karnataka Circle, Basaveshwara Circle (Navanagar), Cancer Hospital, Navanagar, RTO BRTS Station, Karnataka State Law University, Amar Nagar, Sutagatti
Navanagar/Sutagatti to CBT, Hubballi or Hubballi Railway Station	Karnataka Circle, Basaveshwara Circle (Navanagar), Cancer Hospital, Navanagar, RTO BRTS Station, Karnataka State Law University, Amar Nagar, Sutagatti
Navanagar/Sutagatti to Hubballi Old Bus Stand or HDMC	Karnataka Circle, Basaveshwara Circle (Navanagar), Cancer Hospital, Navanagar, RTO BRTS Station, Karnataka State Law University, Amar Nagar, Sutagatti
Navanagar/Sutagatti to KLE Technological University	Karnataka Circle, Basaveshwara Circle (Navanagar), Cancer Hospital, Navanagar, RTO BRTS Station, Karnataka State Law University, Amar Nagar, Sutagatti

== Project status ==
HDBRTS commenced trial runs on 2 October 2018. The first trial run was initiated over an 8 km stretch between Hubballi Railway Station and Srinagar. The trial runs were slowly extended over the 20 km stretch between Hubballi and Dharwad. Different types of services were introduced during the trial run, like all-stops, limited-stops and non-stop. The fleet size has been increased, and HDBRTS currently operates a fleet of 100 buses with approximately 1,240 trips per day. Approximately 100,000 passengers travel with HDBRTS every day. The "Chigari" buses operate in "limited-stop" and "all-stop" modes. The travel time for "limited-stop" services is 35 minutes and for "all-stop" services is 55 minutes.

Smart Card, web-portal and a mobile application were launched on 10 January 2020.

== Green BRTS ==
Green BRTS is an initiative of the Hubballi Dharwad BRTS Company Ltd., as a result of which, tree saplings have been planted at various locations in Hubballi and Dharwad. The Hubballi Dharwad BRTS Company Ltd. has planted approximately 27,500 saplings over a period of 5 years in the premises of government offices, schools, colleges and eco-parks.

Approximately 5,000 saplings have been planted along the HDBRTS corridor. An initiative to map the plantation under Green BRTS was started in June 2016 by the Directorate of Urban Land Transport and Hubballi Dharwad BRTS Company Ltd. This mapping initiative supports an online public platform for intimating to the government, or otherwise ascertaining from the government the status of the plantation. This will also help in analyzing the growth, survival rate, etc., of the trees at different stages. In addition, the effective selection of locations and species, maintenance schedule, etc., with public participation are a significant part of future plans.

== Awards ==
- "Award of Excellence-2019" under "Best Urban Mass Transit Project" by Ministry of Housing and Urban Affairs, Government of India.
