= List of cities in Karnataka by population =

The following is a list of the most populous cities in the Karnataka state of India as per the 2011 census. There are 27 cities in Karnataka which have a population over 100,000.

== List of cities ==
Rank (2011)	City	District	Population 2011	Population 2001	Population 1991
1	Bengaluru	Bengaluru Urban	8,495,492	5,688,985	3,302,296
2	Mysore	Mysore	926,550	804,408	658,755
3	Hubli–Dharwad	Dharwad	950,788	791,195	652,298
4	Mangaluru	Dakshina Kannada	627,000	542,265	431,010
5	Kalaburagi	Kalaburagi	533,587	422,569	311,759
6	Belagavi	Belagavi	614,487	510,327	406,304
7	Davanagere	Davanagere	434,971	364,523	266,082
8	Ballari	Ballari	410,445	316,766	245,391
9	Vijayapura	Vijayapura	327,427	253,891	186,939
10	Shimoga	Shimoga	322,650	274,352	193,028
11	Tumkur	Tumakuru	302,143	248,929	179,877
12	Raichur	Raichur	234,073	207,421	170,577
13	Bidar	Bidar	216,020	174,257	108,016
14	Udupi	Udupi	215,500	127,124	78,094
15	Hospet	Vijayanagara	206,167	164,240	96,322
16	Gadag-Betageri	Gadag	172,612	154,982	134,051
17	Robertsonpet	Kolar	162,230	157,084	68,230
18	Hassan	Hassan	155,006	121,874	90,803
19	Bhadravati	Shimoga	151,102	160,662	67,019
20	Chitradurga	Chitradurga	145,853	125,170	87,069
21	Kolar	Kolar	138,462	113,907	83,287
22	Mandya	Mandya	137,358	131,179	120,265
23	Chikmagalur	Chikmagalur	118,401	101,251	60,816
24	Gangavati	Koppal	114,642	101,392	81,156
25	Bagalkot	Bagalkot	111,933	90,988	76,903
26	Ranebennuru	Haveri	106,406	89,618	67,442
27	Arsikere	Hassan	103,304	68,863	53,755

== See also ==
- List of districts of Karnataka
- List of urban agglomerations in Karnataka
- List of most populous metropolitan areas in India
- List of most populous cities in India
- List of states and union territories of India by population
- Demographics of India
