= Urban agglomerations in Karnataka =

In the 2011 Census of India, an urban agglomeration was defined as "An urban agglomeration is a continuous urban spread constituting a town and its adjoining outgrowths, or two or more physically contiguous towns together with or without outgrowths of such towns. An Urban Agglomeration must consist of at least a statutory town and its total population (i.e. all the constituents put together) should not be less than 20,000 as per the 2001 Census."

Top 10 largest urban agglomerations in Karnataka

Urban agglomerations in the state of Karnataka with a population of 100,000 and above based on the Census of India of 2011
Rank	City	District	Population 2011
1	Bengaluru	Bengaluru Urban	8,520,435
2	Mysuru	Mysuru	990,900
3	Hubballi-Dharwad	Dharwad	943,788
4	Mangaluru	Dakshina Kannada	623,841
5	Belagavi	Belagavi	610,350
6	Kalaburagi	Kalaburagi	543,147
7	Davanagere	Davanagere	434,971
8	Ballari	Ballari	410,445
9	Vijayapura	Vijayapura	327,427
10	Shivamogga	Shivamogga	322,650
11	Tumakuru	Tumakuru	302,143
12	Raichuru	Raichuru	234,073
13	Bidar	Bidar	216,020
14	Udupi	Udupi	215,500
15	Hosapete	Vijayanagara	206,167
16	Hassana	Hassana	173,008
17	Gadaga-Betageri	Gadaga	172,612
18	Robertsonpete	Kolara	162,230
19	Bhadravati	Shivamogga	151,102
20	Chitradurga	Chitradurga	145,853
21	Kolara	Kolara	138,462
22	Mandya	Mandya	137,358
23	Chikkamagaluru	Chikkamagaluru	118,401
24	Gangavati	Koppala	114,642
25	Bagalkote	Bagalkote	111,933
26	Ranebennuru	Haveri	106,406
27	Arsikere	Hassan	103,304

== See also ==
- List of districts of Karnataka
- List of most populous metropolitan areas in India
- List of states and union territories of India by population
- Demographics of India
- List of cities in Karnataka by population
- List of million-plus urban agglomerations in India
