= Urban agglomerations in India =

Top 60 urban agglomerations in India by population

India is the seventh-largest country by geographical area, the most populous country with over 1.4 billion people. India consists of twenty-eight states and nine union territories. It is home to 17.5 percent of the world's population.

The first population census in British India was conducted in 1872. Since 1951, a census has been carried out every 10 years. The census in India is carried out by the Office of the Registrar General and Census Commissioner under the Ministry of Home Affairs, and is one of the largest administrative tasks conducted by a federal government.

The latest population figures are based on data from the 2011 Census of India. India has 641,000 inhabited villages and 72.2 percent of the total population reside in these rural areas. Of them 145,000 villages have population size of 500–999 persons; 130,000 villages have population size of 1000–1999 and 128,000 villages have population size of 200–499. There are 3,961 villages that have a population of 10,000 persons or more. India's 27.8 percent urban population lives in more than 5,100 towns and over 380 urban agglomerations. In the decade of 1991–2001, migration to major cities caused rapid increase in urban population. The number of Indians living in urban areas has grown by 31.2% between 1991 and 2001. Yet, in 2001, over 70% lived in rural areas. According to the 2011 census, there were 317 cities in India with population more than 100000, with Mumbai, Delhi and Kolkata having populations over 10 million About 20 percent of the population of India lives in these cities.

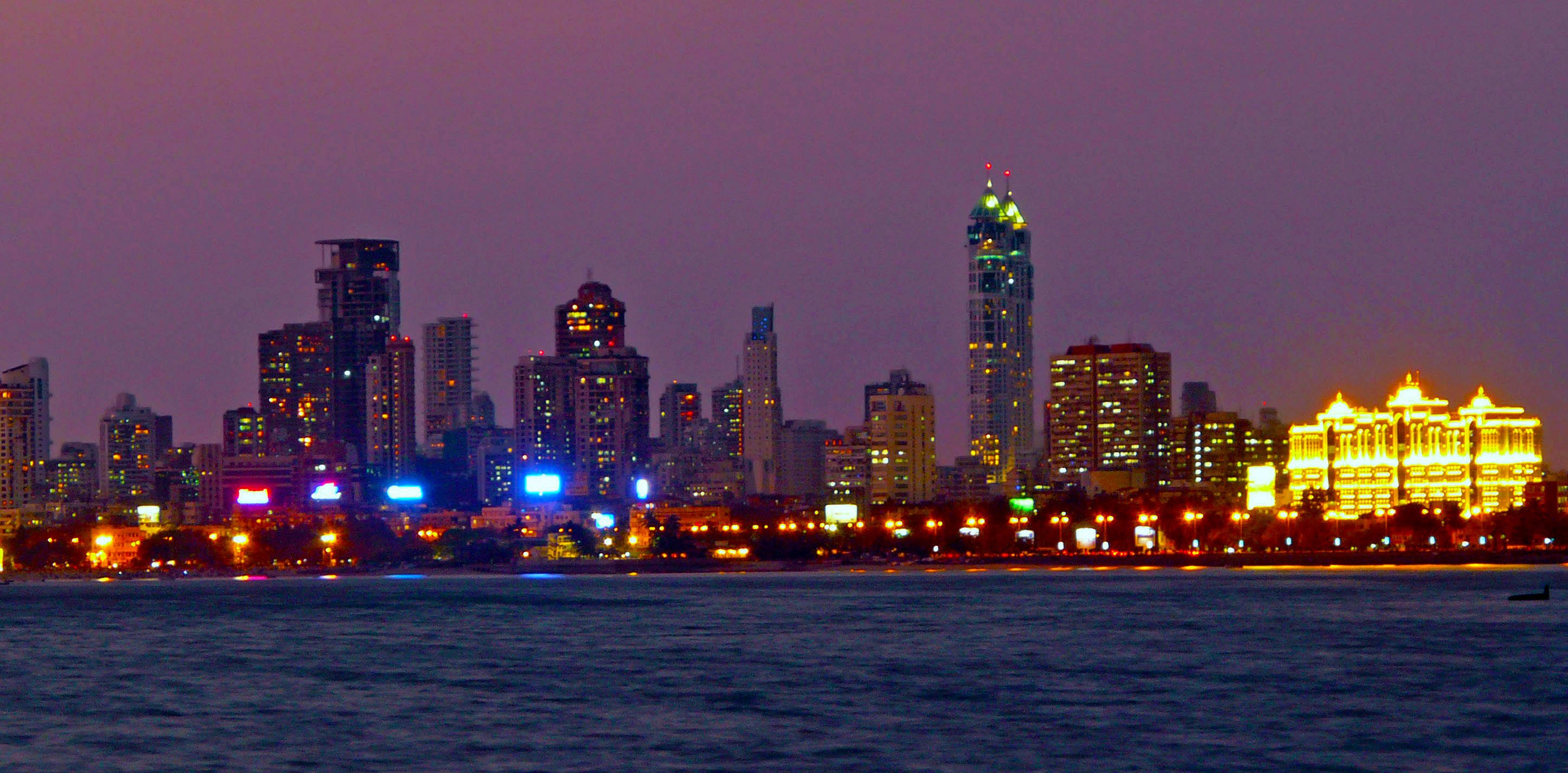
1. Mumbai (Bombay)

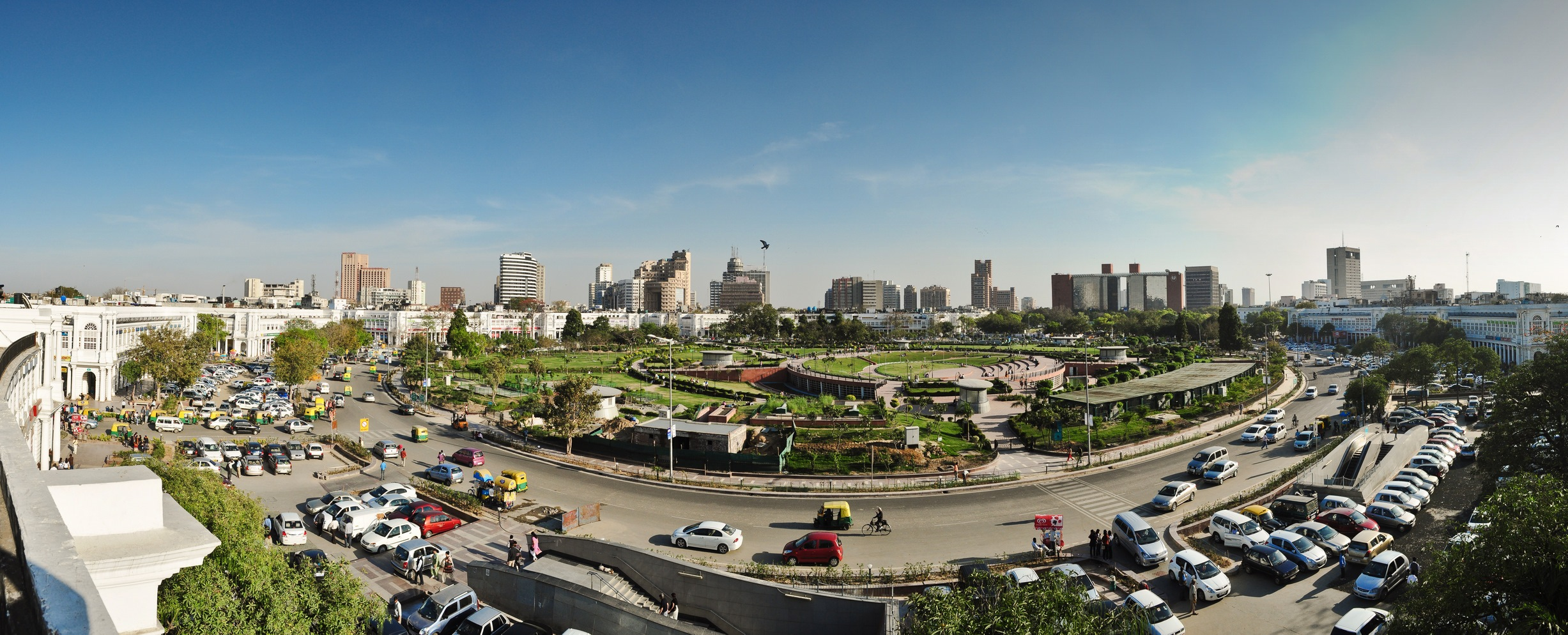
2. Delhi

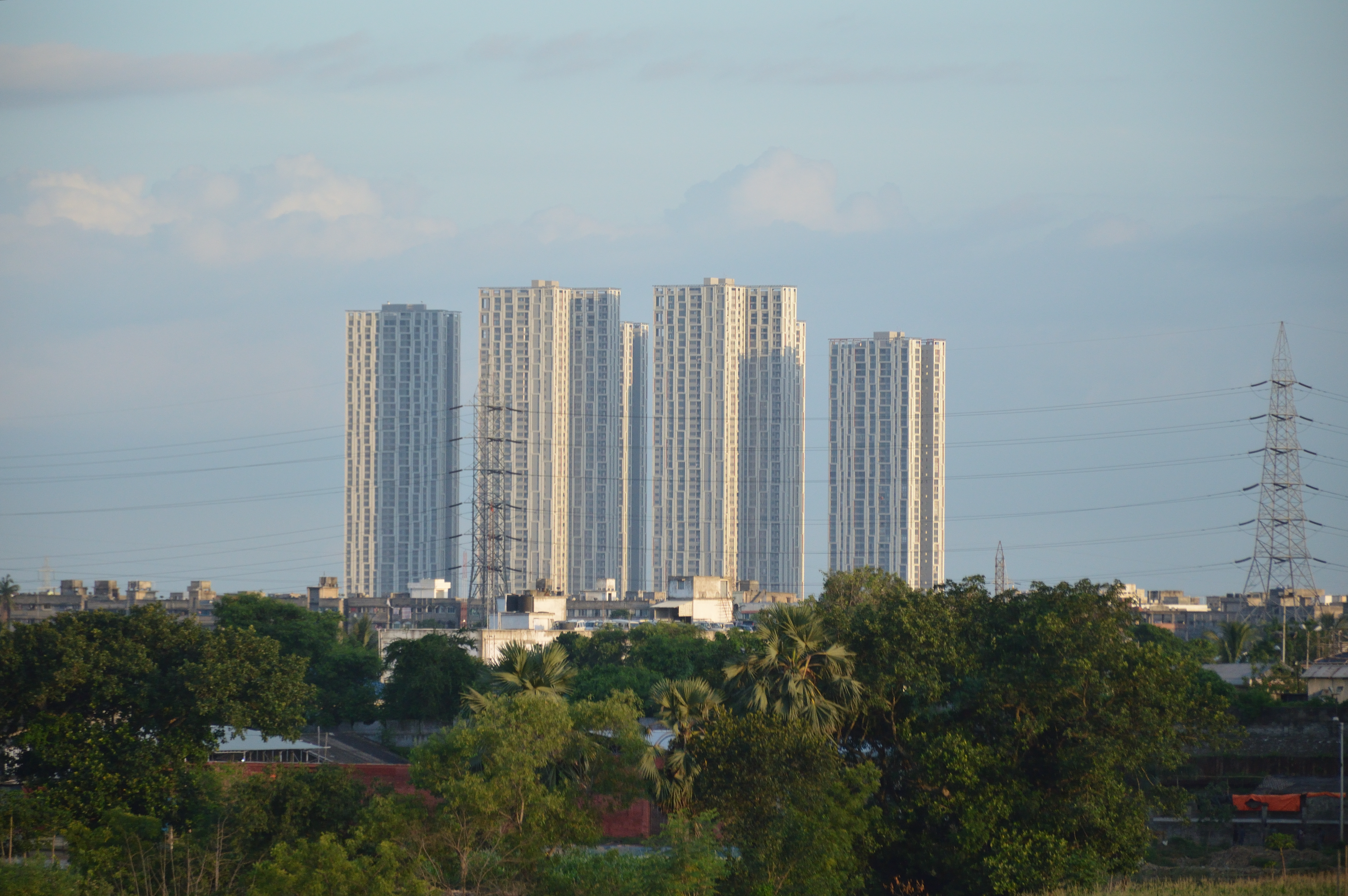
3. Kolkata (Calcutta)

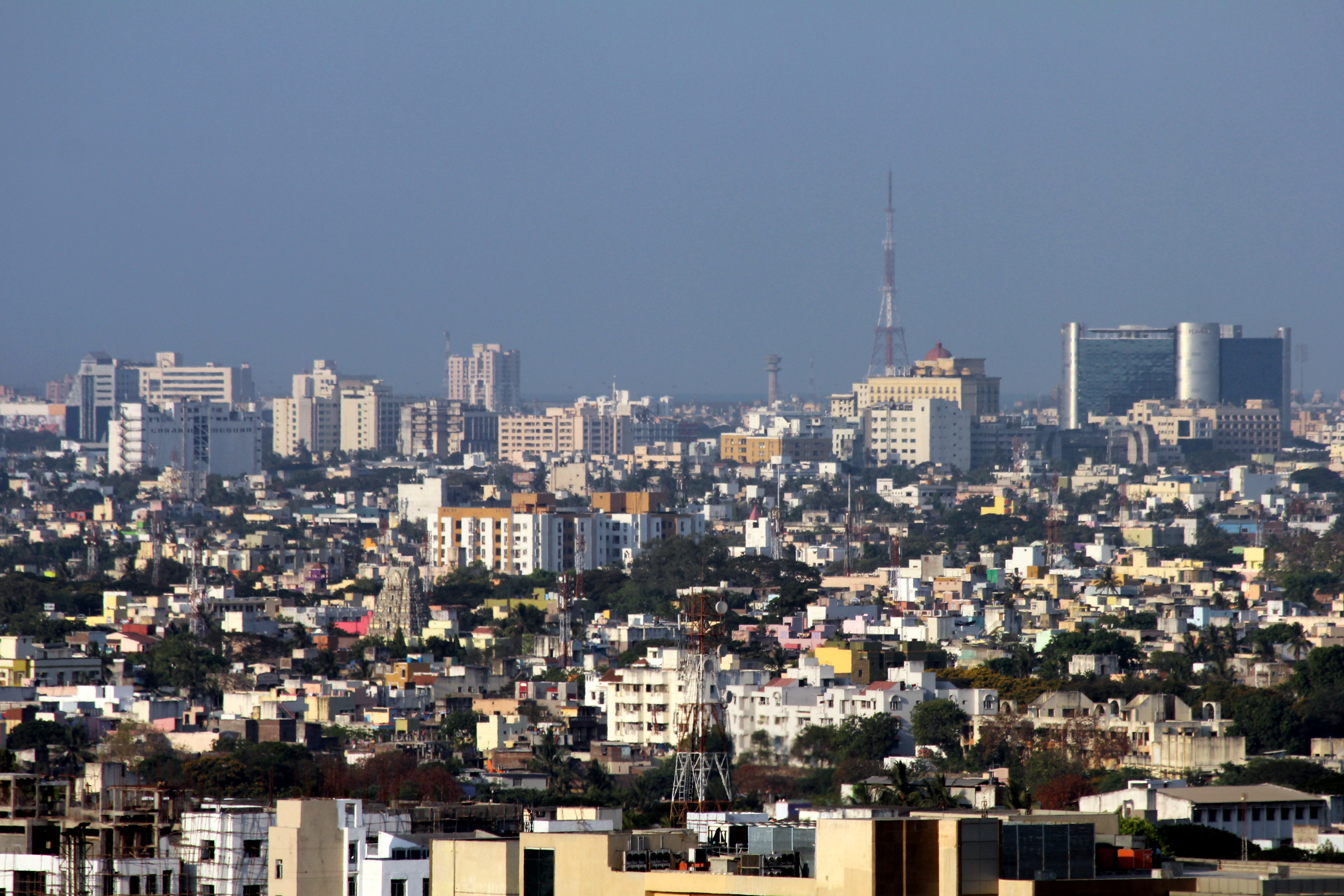
4. Chennai (Madras)

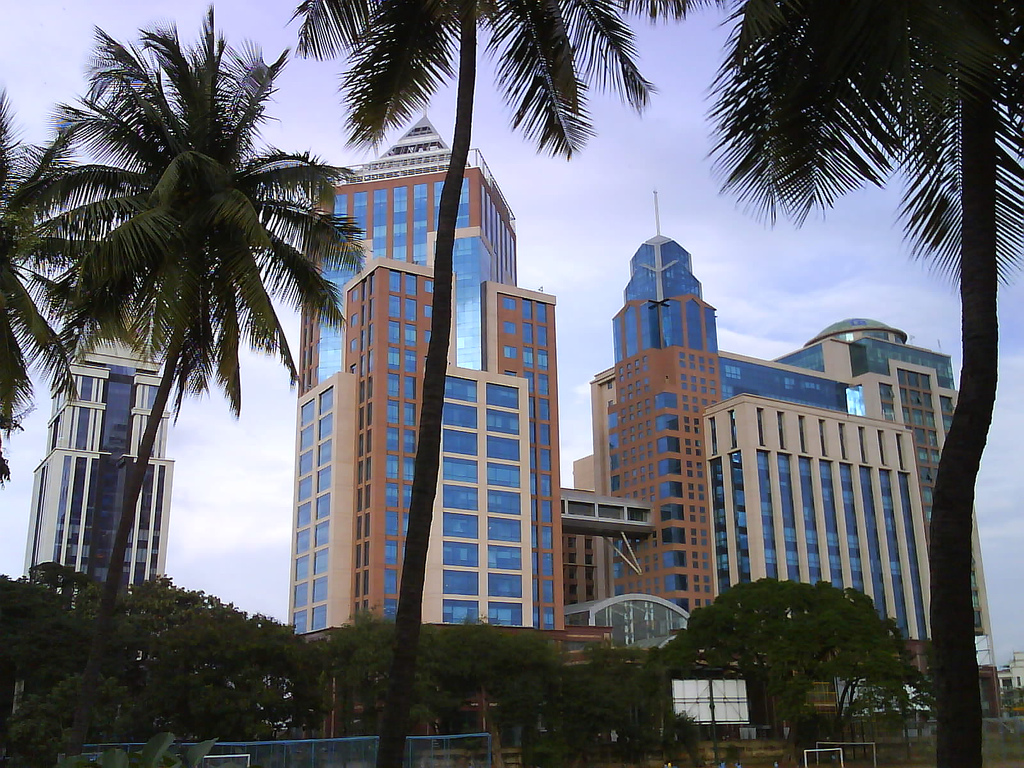
5. Bengaluru

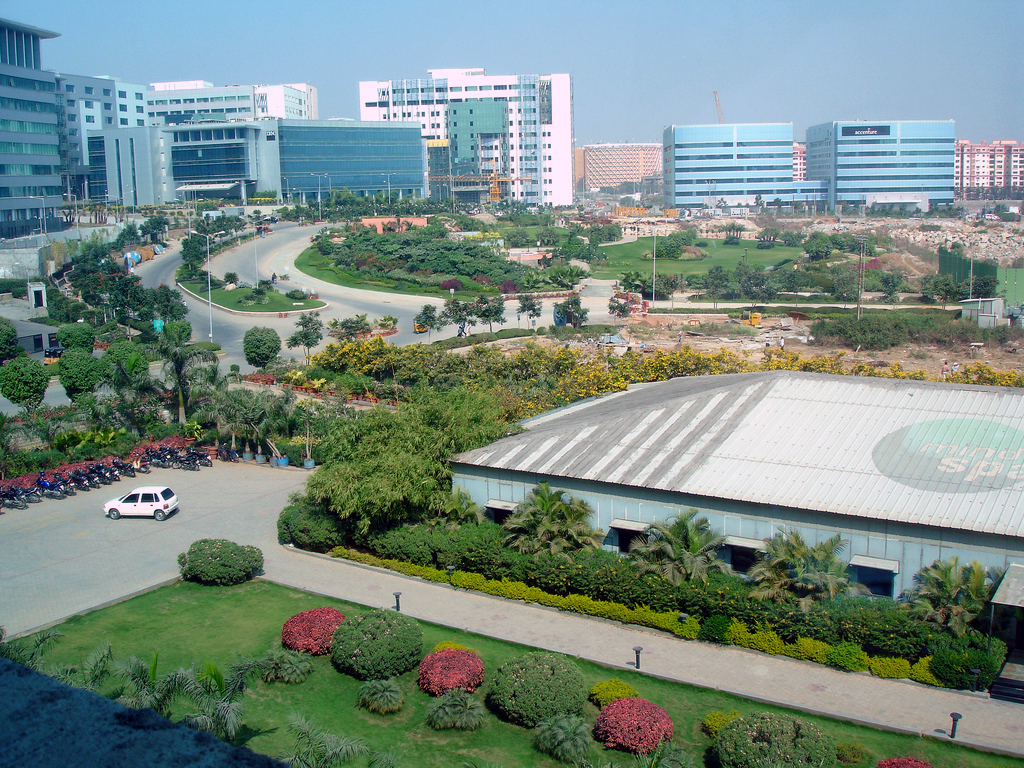
6. Hyderabad

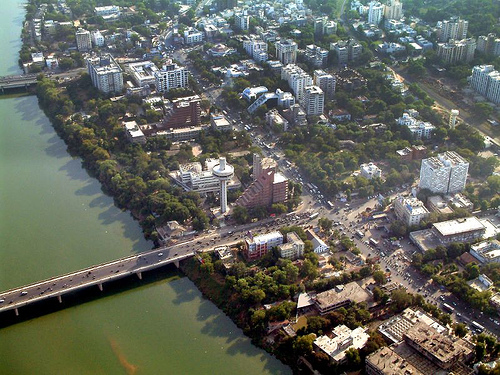
7. Ahmedabad

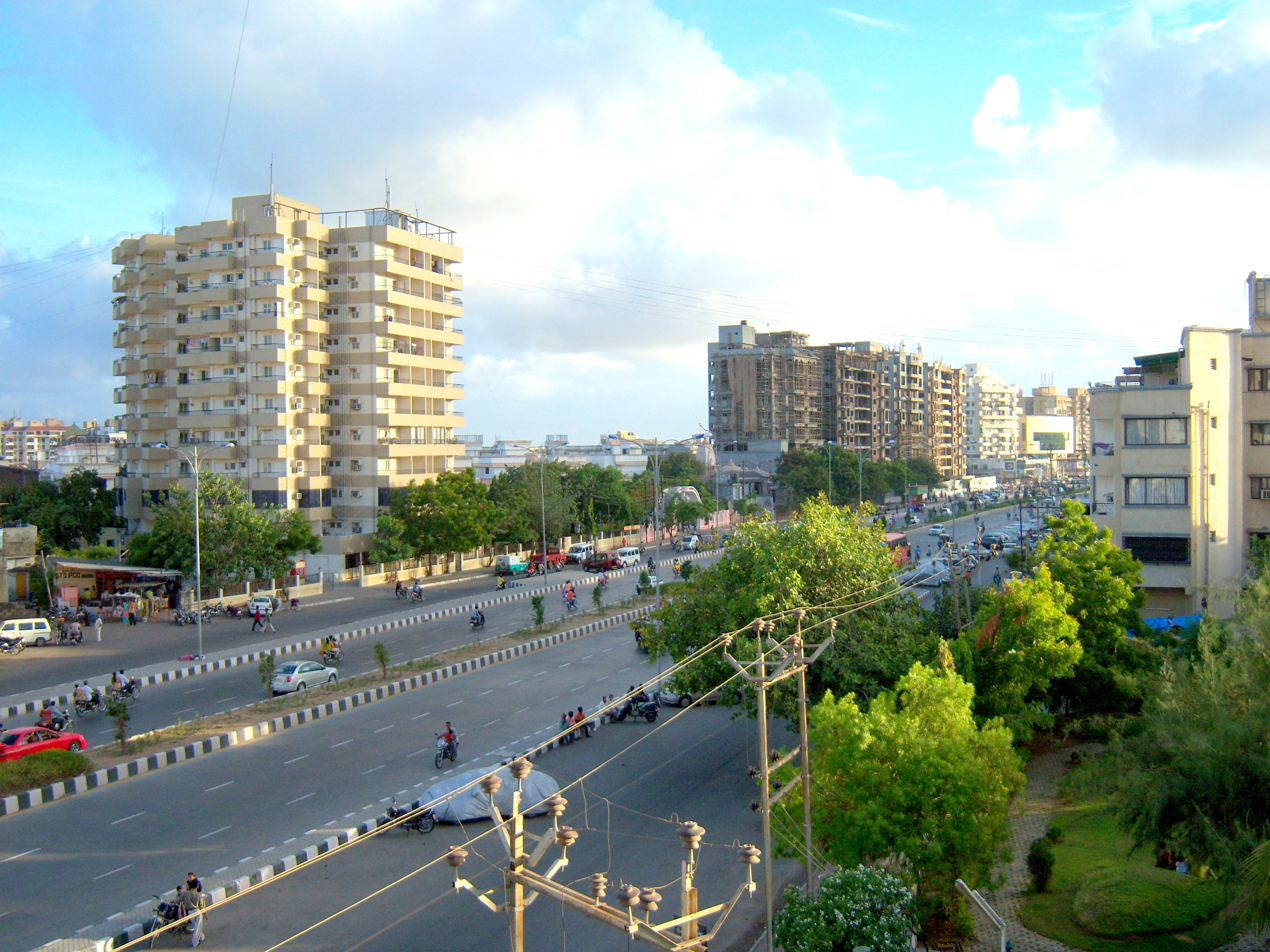
9. Surat

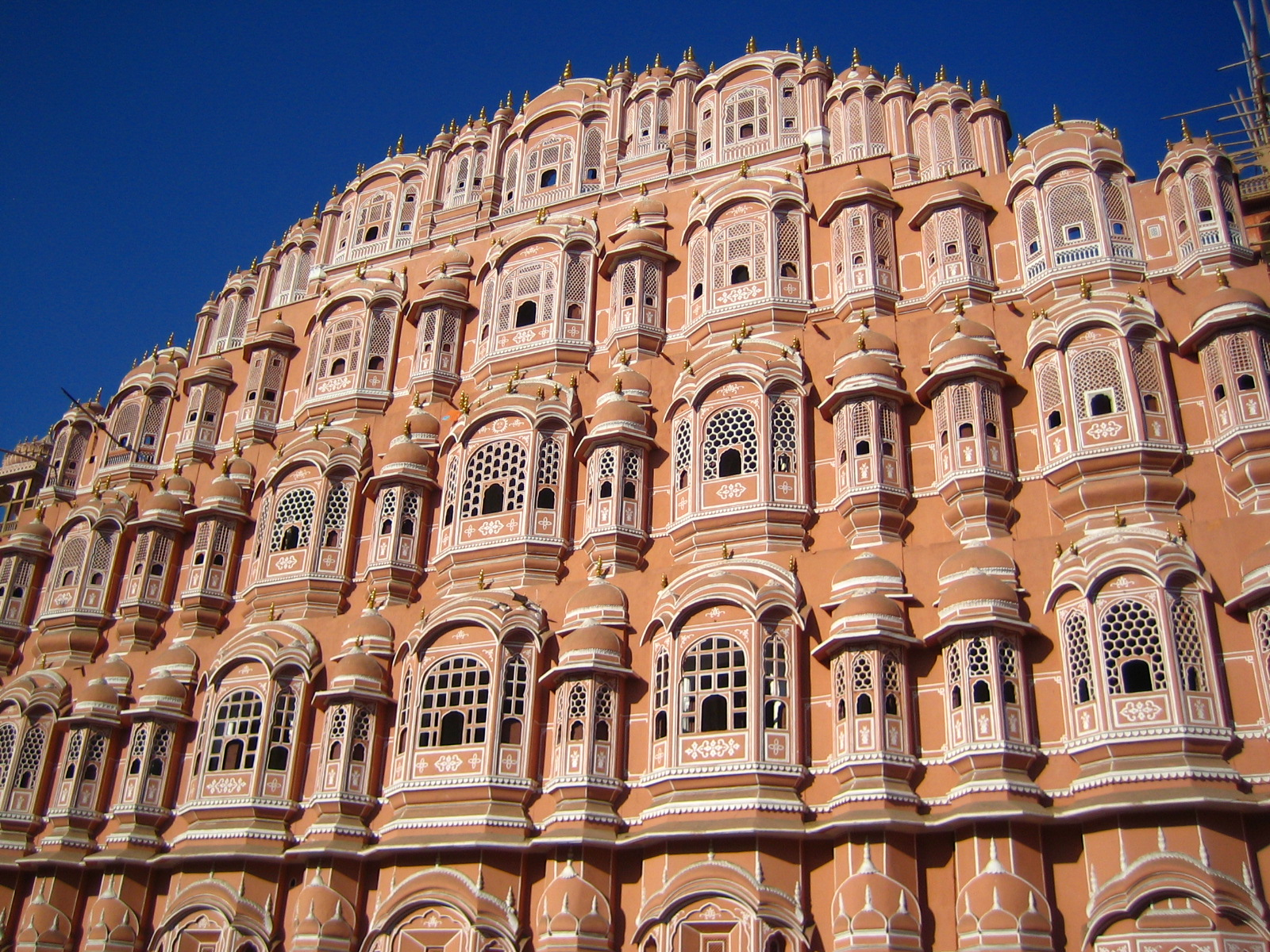
10. Jaipur

The cities which are listed in bold are the capital of the respective state / union territory.

Rank	UA (Note: The population figures of cities in Kerala are inflated as the definition of urban agglomeration was revised in the 2011 census. The population of urban agglomerations in Kerala is not comparable with other cities in the country.)	State/territory	Population (2025)	Population (2011)	Population (2001)	Population (1991)
1	**Delhi**	Delhi	30,222,405	16,349,831	12,877,470	8,419,084
2	**Kolkata**	West Bengal	22,549,738	14,112,536	13,205,697	11,021,918
3	**Mumbai**	Maharashtra	20,203,056	18,394,912	16,434,386	12,596,243
4	**Bengaluru**	Karnataka	13,187,098	8,520,435	5,701,446	4,130,288
5	**Chennai**	Tamil Nadu	11,153,205	8,696,010	6,560,242	5,421,985
6	**Hyderabad**	Telangana	9,190,795	7,749,334	5,742,036	4,344,437
7	Ahmedabad	Gujarat	7,632,408	6,361,084	4,525,013	3,312,216
8	Surat	Gujarat	6,908,925	4,591,246	2,811,614	1,518,950
9	Pune	Maharashtra	6,817,951	5,057,709	3,760,636	2,493,987
10	Kozhikode	Kerala	6,123,872	2,030,519	880,247	801,190
11	Kochi	Kerala	5,077,670	2,119,724	1,355,972	1,140,605
12	**Lucknow**	Uttar Pradesh	5,052,444	2,902,920	2,245,509	1,669,204
13	Malappuram	Kerala	4,487,920	1,699,060	170,409	142,204
14	Kanpur	Uttar Pradesh	4,329,973	2,920,496	2,715,555	2,029,889
15	**Jaipur**	Rajasthan	4,071,754	3,073,350	2,322,575	1,518,235
16	Varanasi	Uttar Pradesh	3,858,863	1,435,113	1,203,961	1,030,863
17	Indore	Madhya Pradesh	3,476,423	2,170,295	1,506,062	1,109,056
18	**Patna**	Bihar	3,309,383	2,049,156	1,697,976	1,099,647
19	Nagpur	Maharashtra	3,257,841	2,497,870	2,129,500	1,664,006
20	Ghaziabad	Uttar Pradesh		2,375,820	968,256	511,759
21	Kollam	Kerala	3,074,562	1,110,668	380,091	362,572
22	**Thiruvananthapuram**	Kerala	2,946,119	1,687,406	889,635	826,225
23	Coimbatore	Tamil Nadu	2,882,988	2,136,916	1,461,139	1,100,746
24	Visakhapatnam	Andhra Pradesh	2,841,957	1,728,128	1,345,938	1,057,118
25	Agra	Uttar Pradesh	2,786,762	1,760,285	1,331,339	948,063
26	Kannur	Kerala	2,524,680	1,642,892	498,207	463,962
27	**Bhopal**	Madhya Pradesh	2,487,205	1,886,100	1,458,416	1,062,771
28	Vijayawada	Andhra Pradesh	2,409,770	1,491,202	1,039,518	845,756
29	Ponnani	Kerala	2,409,567	1,861,269	330,122	275,053
30	Thrissur	Kerala	2,382,988	1,861,269	330,122	275,053
31	Prayagraj	Uttar Pradesh	2,347,869	1,216,719	1,042,229	844,546
32	Vadodara	Gujarat	2,270,298	1,822,221	1,491,045	1,126,824
33	Ludhiana	Punjab	2,245,106	1,618,879	1,398,467	1,042,740
34	Meerut	Uttar Pradesh	2,209,886	1,420,902	1,161,716	849,799
35	Madurai	Tamil Nadu	2,138,746	1,465,625	1,203,095	1,085,914
36	Dhanbad	Jharkhand	2,020,181	1,196,214	1,065,327	815,005
37	Faridabad	Haryana		1,414,050	1,055,938	617,717
38	Nashik	Maharashtra	1,996,763	1,562,769	1,152,326	725,341
39	Jamshedpur	Jharkhand	1,956,840	1,339,438	1,104,713	829,171
40	Rajkot	Gujarat	1,581,235	1,390,933	1,003,015	654,490
37	**Srinagar**	Jammu and Kashmir	1,126,638	1,273,312	988,210	
38	Jabalpur	Madhya Pradesh	1,582,131	1,267,564	1,098,000	888,916
39	Asansol	West Bengal	2,924,741	1,243,414	1,067,369	763,939
40	Vasai-Virar	Maharashtra	1,542,177	1,222,390		
43	Aurangabad	Maharashtra	1,567,020	1,193,167	892,483	592,709
44	Amritsar	Punjab	1,303,330	1,183,705	1,003,919	708,835
45	Jodhpur	Rajasthan	1,515,910	1,138,300	860,818	666,279
46	**Ranchi**	Jharkhand	1,819,944	1,126,741	863,495	614,795
47	**Raipur**	Chhattisgarh	1,478,688	1,123,558	700,113	462,694
49	Gwalior	Madhya Pradesh	1,554,246	1,102,884	865,548	717,780
50	Bhilai	Chhattisgarh	26,80,980	1,064,222	927,864	685,474
51	**Chandigarh**	Chandigarh	2,437,733	1,026,459	808,515	575,829
52	Tiruchirappalli	Tamil Nadu	1,349,040	1,022,518	866,354	711,862
53	Kota	Rajasthan	1,232,364	1,001,694	703,150	537,371
54	Mysuru	Karnataka	1,342,126	990,900	799,228	653,345
55	Bareilly	Uttar Pradesh	1,635,214	985,752	748,353	617,350
56	Guwahati	Assam	1,314,019	968,549	818,809	584,342
57	Tiruppur	Tamil Nadu	1,242,837	963,173	550,826	306,237
58	Solapur	Maharashtra	1,102,702	951,558	872,478	620,846
59	Hubli-Dharwad	Karnataka	965,667	943,857	786,195	648,298
60	Salem	Tamil Nadu	1,337,000	919,150	751,438	578,291
61	Aligarh	Uttar Pradesh	1,729,663	911,223	669,087	480,520
62	Gurugram	Haryana		902,112	228,820	135,884
63	Moradabad	Uttar Pradesh	1,484,611	889,810	641,583	443,701
64	**Bhubaneswar**	Odisha	1,146,434	885,363	658,220	411,542
65	Jalandhar	Punjab	1,192,763	874,412	714,077	509,510
66	Warangal	Telangana	837,561	759,594	579,216	467,757
67	Bhiwandi	Maharashtra		737,411	621,427	392,214
68	Dehradun	Uttarakhand	1,219,198	714,223	530,263	368,053
69	Siliguri	West Bengal	658,183	705,579	472,374	216,950
70	Saharanpur	Uttar Pradesh	1,275,279	705,478	455,754	374,945
71	Gorakhpur	Uttar Pradesh	1,519,206	694,889	622,701	505,566
72	Guntur	Andhra Pradesh	862,068	673,952	514,461	471,051
73	Cuttack	Odisha		663,188	587,182	440,295
74	Jammu	Jammu and Kashmir	1,154,466	657,314	612,163	
75	**Puducherry**	Puducherry	998,290	657,209	505,959	401,437
76	Amravati	Maharashtra	771,610	647,057	549,510	421,576
77	Bikaner	Rajasthan	882,222	647,804	529,690	416,289
78	Noida	Uttar Pradesh		642,381	305,058	146,516
79	Mangaluru	Karnataka	993,566	623,841	539,387	426,341
80	Belagavi	Karnataka	800,130	610,350	506,480	402,412
81	Bhavnagar	Gujarat	739,115	606,282	517,708	405,225
82	Firozabad	Uttar Pradesh	878,282	604,214	432,866	270,536
83	Jamnagar	Gujarat	680,589	600,943	556,956	381,646
84	Durgapur	West Bengal	1222,089	581,409	493,405	425,836
85	Malegaon	Maharashtra	618,133	576,642	497,780	398,890
86	Bokaro	Jharkhand	862,593	564,319	505,541	418,538
87	Nellore	Andhra Pradesh	732,235	564,148	404,775	316,606
88	Kolhapur	Maharashtra	819,671	561,841	505,541	418,538
89	Rourkela	Odisha	776,631	552,970	484,874	398,864
90	Ajmer	Rajasthan	631,176	551,360	490,520	402,700
91	Nanded	Maharashtra	770,215	550,564	430,733	309,316
92	Jhansi	Uttar Pradesh	662,059	549,391	460,278	368,154
93	Kalaburagi	Karnataka	753,963	543,147	430,265	310,920
94	Erode	Tamil Nadu	892,758	521,891	389,906	361,755
95	Ujjain	Madhya Pradesh	583,405	515,215	431,162	362,633
96	Sangli	Maharashtra	761,451	513,961	447,774	363,751
97	Tirunelveli	Tamil Nadu	376,005	498,984	433,352	366,869
98	Muzaffarnagar	Uttar Pradesh	849,004	495,543	331,668	247,624
99	Vellore	Tamil Nadu	820,103	484,690	386,746	310,776
100	Kurnool	Andhra Pradesh	468,997	484,327	342,973	275,360

== See also ==
- List of cities in India by population
- List of metropolitan areas in India
- List of million-plus urban agglomerations in India
- List of states and union territories of India by population
- Demographics of India
