= List of million-plus urban agglomerations in India =

India is a country in South Asia and is the seventh-largest country by geographical area, the most-populous country with more than 1.4 billion people, home to nearly 17.5 percent of the world's population. India consists of twenty-eight states and eight union territories.

== Census ==
The first official population census of India was conducted in 1872 and every ten years since 1951 by the office of the Registrar General and Census Commissioner under the Ministry of Home Affairs. The last official census was conducted in 2011. The next census due in 2021 was delayed due to the COVID-19 pandemic and is scheduled for 2024.

As per Government of India, an urban agglomeration (U.A.) is a continuous urban spread constituting a town and its adjoining outgrowths (OGs), or two or more physically contiguous towns together with or without outgrowths of such towns. An Urban Agglomeration must consist of at least a statutory town and its total population should not be less than 20,000 as per the 2001 Census. In varying local conditions, there were similar other combinations that have been treated as urban agglomerations satisfying the basic condition of contiguity.

Following is the list of urban agglomerations in India with a population of more than one million as per the 2011 census. As per the 2011 census, there were 52 (according to provisional census results, 53) urban agglomerations or cities with population of one million and above. (Note: The population figures of cities in Kerala are inflated as the definition of urban agglomeration was revised in the 2011 census. The population of urban agglomerations in Kerala is not comparable with other cities in the country.)

Urban agglomerations in India with a population of over one million

List of million-plus urban agglomerations/ towns
Town/UA (Note: The population figures of cities in Kerala are inflated as the definition of urban agglomeration was revised in the 2011 census. The population of urban agglomerations in Kerala is not comparable with other cities in the country.)	Level (2011) (Note: As per the census, standalone towns not part of an urban agglomeration are mentioned as such)	State/UT	Area (km^{2}) (2011)	Pop. (2011)	Area (km^{2}) (2001)	Pop. (2001)	Area (km^{2}) (1991)	Pop. (1991)
**Mumbai**	U.A.	Maharashtra	1,063.49	18,394,912	1,135.11	16,434,386	1,040.9	12,596,243
**Delhi**	U.A.	Delhi	1,139.48	16,349,831	912.52	12,895,547	685.34	8,471,625
**Kolkata**	U.A.	West Bengal	1,056.13	14,057,991	1,046.46	13,251,339	920.65	11,110,314
**Chennai**	U.A.	Tamil Nadu	932.47	8,653,521	788.69	6,686,140	580.06	5,416,903
**Bengaluru**	U.A.	Karnataka	748.42	8,520,435	539.85	5,701,446	449.7	4,137,314
**Hyderabad**	U.A.	Telangana	1,225.59	7,677,018	838.03	5,756,729	838.03	4,344,437
Ahmedabad	U.A.	Gujarat	1,060.95	6,357,693	613.81	4,912,912	425.17	3,631,233
Pune	U.A.	Maharashtra	502.78	5,057,709	675.66	3,768,612	423.42	2,493,987
Surat	U.A.	Gujarat	431.01	4,591,246	289.83	2,820,373	114.07	1,514,545
**Jaipur**	U.A.	Rajasthan	484.64	3,046,163	484.64	2,322,575	218.26	1,518,235
Kanpur	U.A.	Uttar Pradesh	301.16	2,920,496	301.02	2,715,555	298.98	2,029,889
**Lucknow**	U.A.	Uttar Pradesh	393.6	2,902,920	337.5	2,245,509	337.5	1,669,204
Nagpur	U.A.	Maharashtra	229.2	2,497,870	229.2	2,129,500	228.81	1,664,006
Ghaziabad	U.A.	Uttar Pradesh	263.29	2,375,820	161.21	1,217,543	79.89	578,680
Indore	U.A.	Madhya Pradesh	233.6	2,170,295	165.17	1,516,918	165.17	1,109,056
Coimbatore	U.A.	Tamil Nadu	696.25	2,136,916	598.12	1,601,194	317.23	1,100,746
Kochi	U.A.	Kerala	843.84	2,119,724	477.08	1,410,666	426.67	1,242,115
**Patna**	U.A.	Bihar	142.46	2,049,156	135.19	1,697,976	132.27	1,140,100
Kozhikode	U.A.	Kerala	909.79	2,028,399	334.94	1,101,157	339.67	945,802
**Bhopal**	U.A.	Madhya Pradesh	336.06	1,886,100	298.48	1,458,416	284.9	1,062,771
Thrissur	U.A.	Kerala	990.91	1,861,269	310.49	773,598	252.65	627,063
Vadodara	U.A.	Gujarat	310.35	1,822,221	213.88	1,491,045	132.54	1,127,903
Agra	U.A.	Uttar Pradesh	166.21	1,760,285	149.37	1,374,493	145.36	961,420
Visakhapatnam	Town	Andhra Pradesh	513.61	1,728,128	325.83	1,345,938	310.97	1,044,119
Malappuram	U.A.	Kerala	819.39	1,699,060	152.67	311,558	137.11	243,427
**Thiruvananthapuram**	U.A.	Kerala	542.57	1,679,754	256.22	1,050,933	242.07	959,256
Kannur	U.A.	Kerala	1,003.66	1,640,986	638.95	1,212,898	647.14	1,145,476
Ludhiana	Town	Punjab	159.37	1,618,879	159.37	1,398,467	134.67	1,042,740
Nashik	U.A.	Maharashtra	321.98	1,561,809	321.98	1,152,326	321.94	725,341
Vijayawada	U.A.	Andhra Pradesh	283.58	1,476,931	101.2	1,039,518	104.71	845,756
Madurai	U.A.	Tamil Nadu	151.34	1,465,625	143.43	1,220,898	110.21	1,077,158
Varanasi	U.A.	Uttar Pradesh	118.68	1,432,280	114.31	1,216,392	106.82	1,039,939
Meerut	U.A.	Uttar Pradesh	186.61	1,420,902	183.64	1,172,106	177.58	849,799
Faridabad	Town	Haryana	204.00	1,414,050	198.75	1,055,938	178.24	617,717
Rajkot	U.A.	Gujarat	185.38	1,390,640	163.14	1,003,015	69	654,490
Jamshedpur	U.A.	Jharkhand	184.07	1,339,438	159.55	1,104,713	159.55	829,171
Jabalpur	U.A.	Madhya Pradesh	237.16	1,268,848	205.15	1,098,000	224.45	888,916
**Srinagar**	U.A.	Jammu and Kashmir	304.27	1,264,202	242.6	988,210	NA	NA
Asansol	Town	West Bengal	369.34	1,243,414	351.93	1,067,369	280.74	938,067
Vasai-Virar	Town	Maharashtra	319.39	1,222,390	74.55	518,601	50.69	215,762
Allahabad	U.A.	Uttar Pradesh	115.46	1,212,395	85.69	1,042,229	82.18	844,546
Dhanbad	U.A.	Jharkhand	240.66	1,196,214	223.06	1,065,327	207.99	828,301
Aurangabad	U.A.	Maharashtra	148.12	1,193,167	148.12	892,483	148.12	592,709
Amritsar	U.A.	Punjab	136	1,183,549	136	1,003,917	114.95	708,835
Jodhpur	U.A.	Rajasthan	132.97	1,138,300	90.34	860,818	78.6	666,279
**Ranchi**	U.A.	Jharkhand	197.36	1,126,720	182.09	863,495	182.09	614,795
**Raipur**	U.A.	Chhattisgarh	192.55	1,123,558	128.05	743,494	64.29	462,694
Kollam	U.A.	Kerala	364.51	1,110,668	78.55	418,743	77.24	365,130
Gwalior	U.A.	Madhya Pradesh	183.71	1,102,884	180.16	865,548	303.18	717,780
Durg-Bhilainagar	U.A.	Chhattisgarh	335.63	1,064,222	340.75	927,864	202.3	705,076
Tiruchirappalli	U.A.	Tamil Nadu	211.51	1,022,518	198.55	887,865	170.57	729,127
Kota	Town	Rajasthan	527.03	1,001,694	225.87	703,150	221.36	537,371

Notes:

- Chandigarh was included in the list of million plus populous urban agglomerations as per provisional census, however, did not feature in the final census.
- Cities in **bold** represent the urban agglomerations which incorporate a capital of a state or union territory

== Demographia ==
As per Demographia, an urban built-up area consists of all continuous and non-continuous urban areas within a metropolitan area. As per the 2023 report, there were 65 urban areas with more than one million inhabitants in India.

Town/UA	State/UT	Pop. (2023)
**Delhi**	Delhi, Haryana, Uttar Pradesh	31,190,000
**Mumbai**	Maharashtra	25,189,000
**Kolkata**	West Bengal	21,747,000
**Bengaluru**	Karnataka	15,257,000
**Chennai**	Tamil Nadu	11,570,000
**Hyderabad**	Telangana	9,797,000
**Ahmedabad**	Gujarat	8,006,000
Pune	Maharashtra	6,819,000
Surat	Gujarat	6,601,000
**Lucknow**	Uttar Pradesh	4,661,000
**Jaipur**	Rajasthan	4,360,000
Kanpur	Uttar Pradesh	4,350,000
Indore	Madhya Pradesh	3,765,000
Nagpur	Maharashtra	3,493,000
**Patna**	Bihar	3,331,000
Varanasi	Uttar Pradesh	3,229,000
Kozhikode	Kerala	3,049,000
**Thiruvananthapuram**	Kerala	2,851,000
Agra	Uttar Pradesh	2,737,000
**Bhopal**	Madhya Pradesh	2,562,000
Coimbatore	Tamil Nadu	2,551,000
Prayagraj	Uttar Pradesh	2,438,000
Kochi	Kerala	2,381,000
**Ranchi**	Jharkhand	2,217,000
Ludhiana	Punjab	2,205,000
Vadodara	Gujarat	2,182,000
**Chandigarh**	Chandigarh, Punjab, Haryana	2,168,000
Madurai	Tamil Nadu	2,048,000
Meerut	Uttar Pradesh	2,011,000
Visakhapatnam	Andhra Pradesh	2,005,000
Jamshedpur	Jharkhand	1,925,000
Thrissur	Kerala	1,861,269
Nashik	Maharashtra	1,810,000
Asansol	West Bengal	1,720,000
Malappuram	Kerala	1,699,060
Aligarh	Uttar Pradesh	1,660,000
Kannur	Kerala	1,640,986
Jabalpur	Madhya Pradesh	1,533,000
Dhanbad	Jharkhand	1,503,000
Jodhpur	Rajasthan	1,497,000
Aurangabad	Maharashtra	1,490,000
Rajkot	Gujarat	1,487,000
Gwalior	Madhya Pradesh	1,477,000
**Raipur**	Chhattisgarh	1,429,000
Gorakhpur	Uttar Pradesh	1,410,000
Kollam	Kerala	1,351,000
Bareilly	Uttar Pradesh	1,355,000
**Guwahati**	Assam	1,355,000
Moradabad	Uttar Pradesh	1,345,000
Amritsar	Punjab	1,313,000
Mysore	Karnataka	1,296,000
Durg-Bhilainagar	Chhattisgarh	1,293,000
Vijayawada	Andhra Pradesh	1,232,000
**Srinagar**	Jammu and Kashmir	1,212,000
Salem	Tamil Nadu	1,189,000
Kota	Rajasthan	1,172,000
Jalandhar	Punjab	1,165,000
Saharanpur	Uttar Pradesh	1,152,000
**Dehradun**	Uttarakhand	1,136,000
Tiruchirappalli	Tamil Nadu	1,131,000
**Bhubaneswar**	Odisha	1,112,000
Jammu	Jammu and Kashmir	1,103,000
Solapur	Maharashtra	1,082,000
Hubli-Dharwad	Karnataka	1,062,000
**Puducherry**	Puducherry	1,024,000

Notes:

- **Bold** represents the capital of the respective state or union territory or the capital is part of the respective urban agglomeration - example - Gandhinagar, a state capital is a part of the Ahmedadbad U.A.

== See also ==
- List of cities in India by population
- List of metropolitan areas in India
- List of states and union territories of India by population
- List of urban agglomerations in India
- Demographics of India
