= Hubli–Dharwad =

Hubli-Dharwad
- Twin city
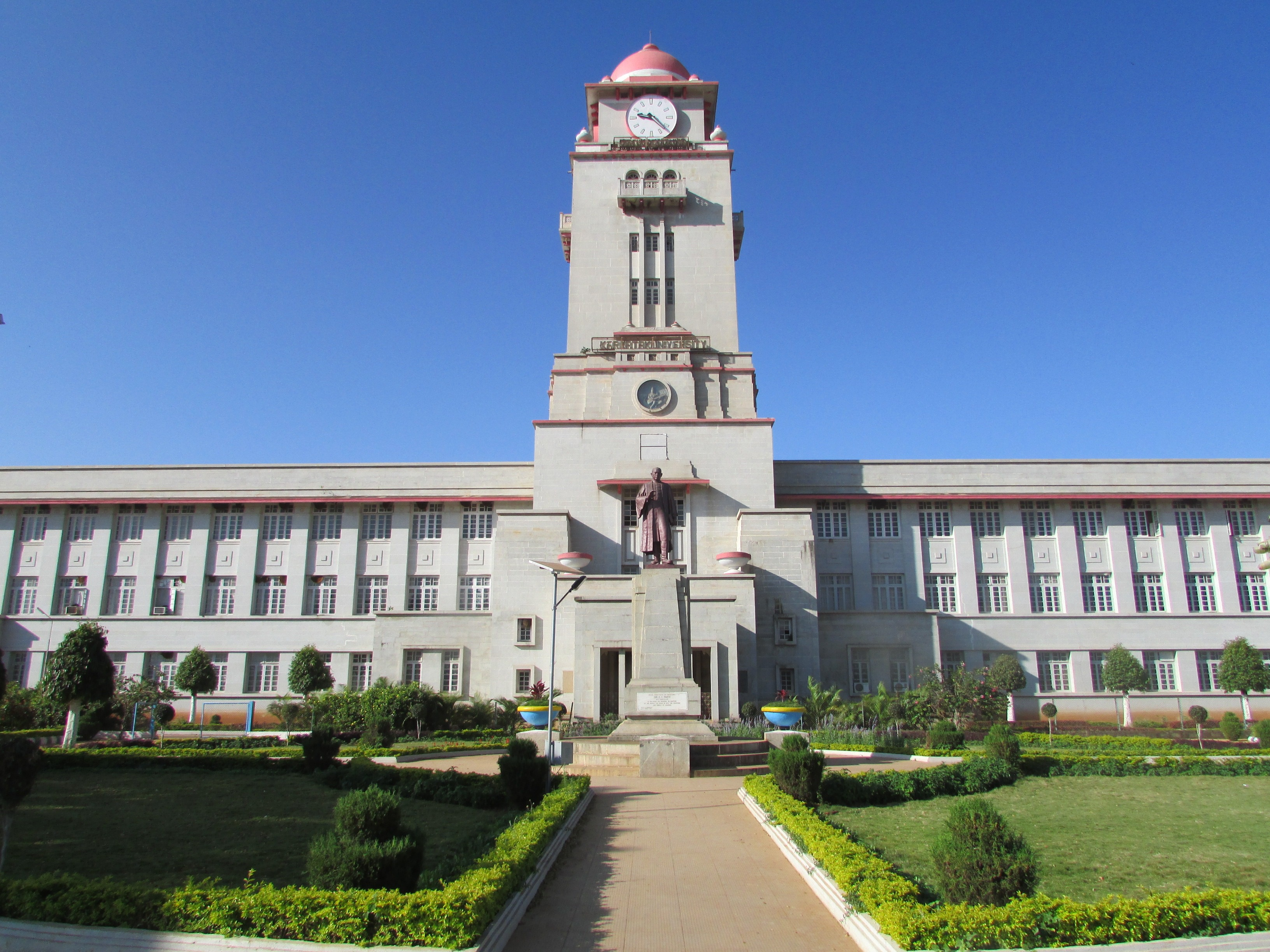
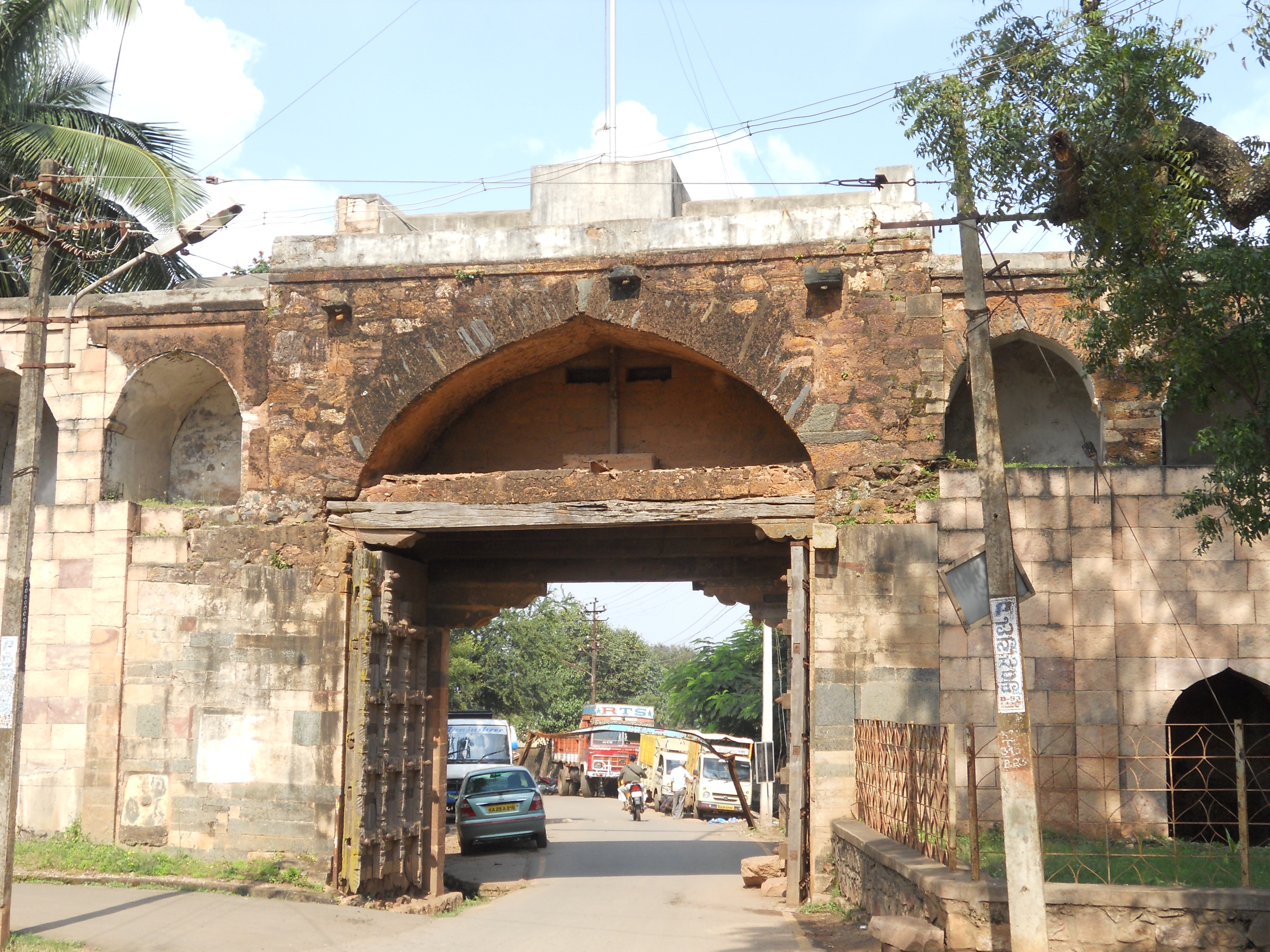
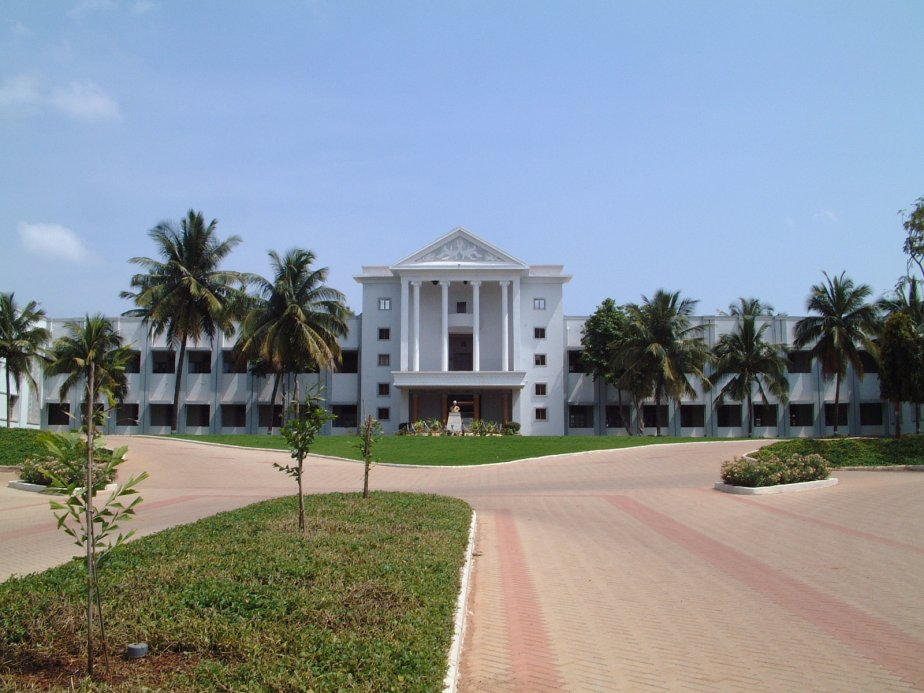
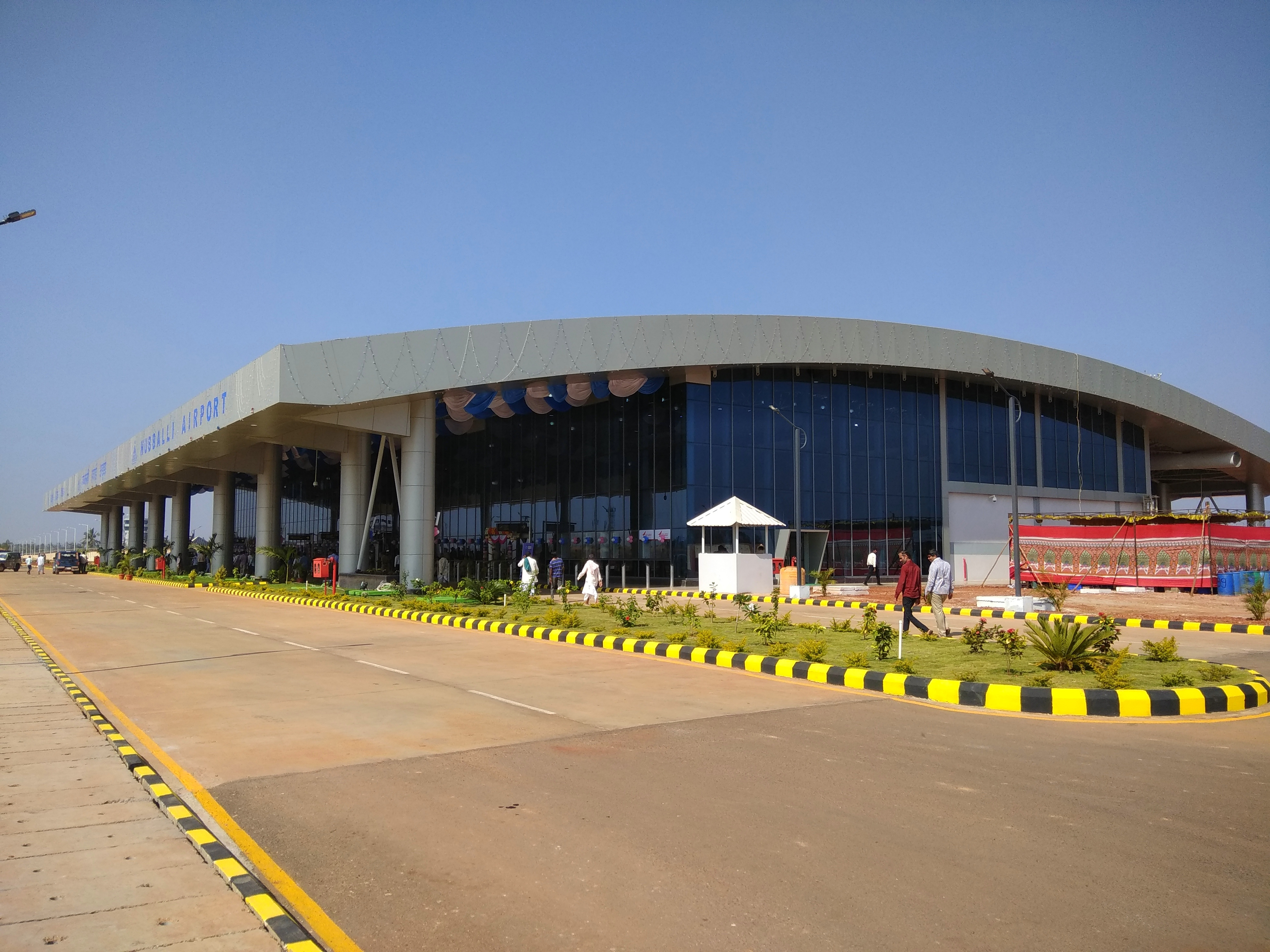
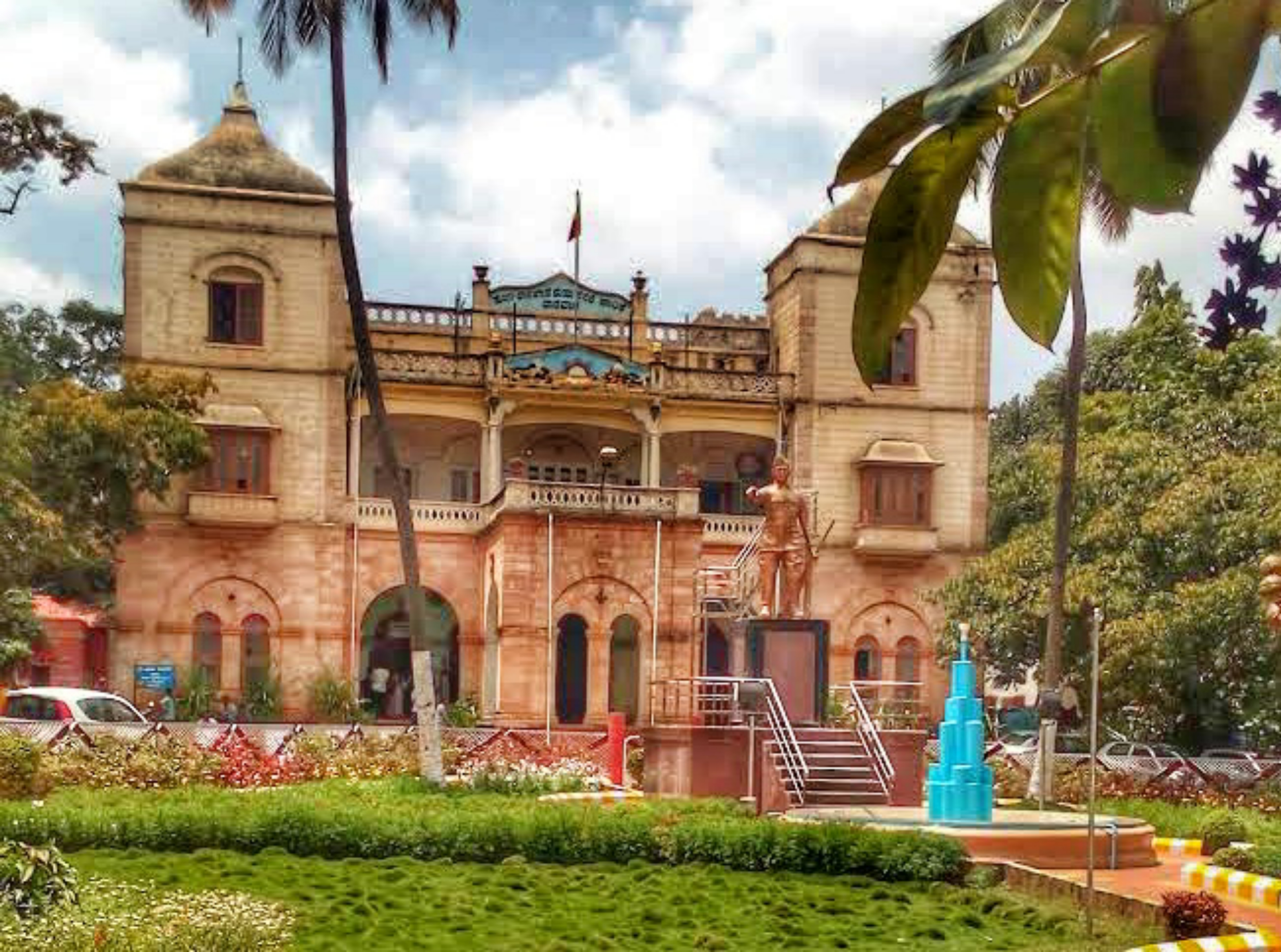
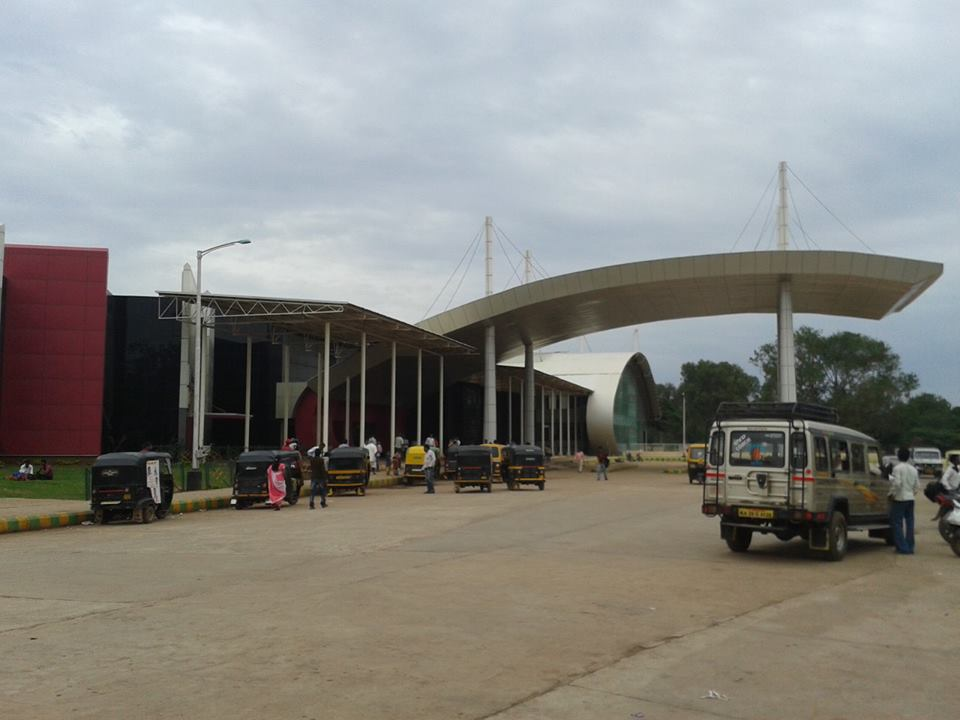
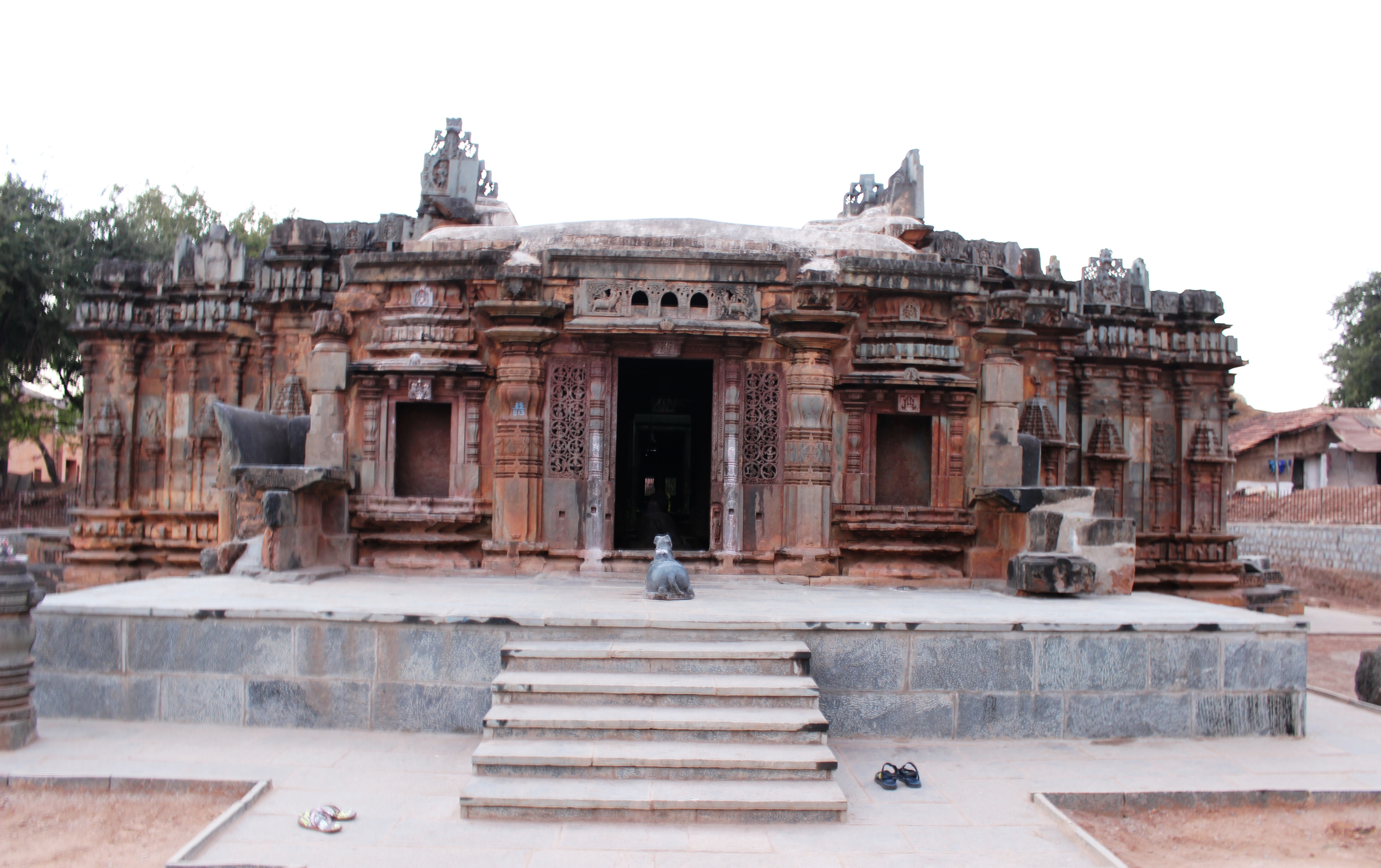
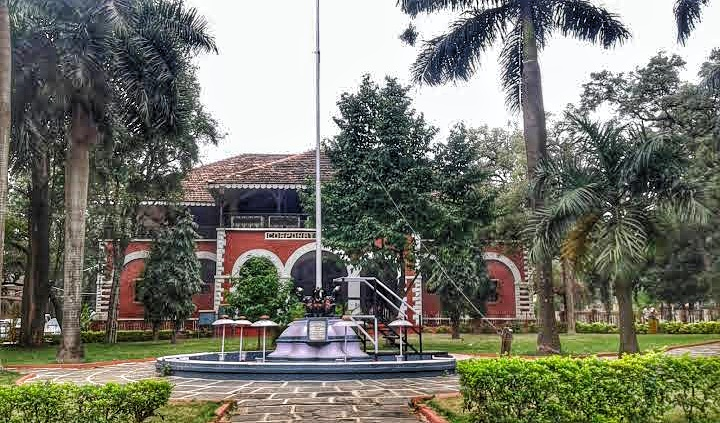
- Karnatak University Gate of Dharwad Fort BVB College of Engineering and Technology Hubli Airport HDMC office Hubli Junction railway station Chandramouleshwara Temple HDMC office
- Interactive map of Hubli-Dharwad
- Location within Karnataka Location within India
- Coordinates: 15°24′35″N 75°03′45″E
- Country: India
- State: Karnataka
- District: Dharwad

Population
  - Twin city: 943,788
  - Rank: India : 52; Karnataka : 2
  - Metro: 943,788
- Planning agency: Hubballi-Dharwad Urban Development Authority

Hubli (or Hubballi) and Dharwad are twin cities in the Indian state of Karnataka. Hubli-Dharwad form the second-largest municipality and urban agglomeration of Karnataka in terms of population, after the capital Bangalore. While Dharwad is the administrative headquarters, the city of Hubli, situated about 20 km (12 mi) south-east of Dharwad, is the commercial centre and business hub of North Karnataka. The cities have a single municipal corporation called Hubli-Dharwad Municipal Corporation (HDMC).

Hubli-Dharwad has the world's longest railway platform and Dharwad is known as an educational hub of Karnataka, along with other Karnataka cities such as Udupi and Dakshina Kannada.

The twin cities have the only BRTS (Bus Rapid Transit System) in Karnataka. Hubli Dharwad BRTS also known as HDBRTS serves the twin cities with a separate corridor along with city roads. Both Hubli and Dharwad have industrial estates and industrial companies with a number of factories and several services. There are three rail stations between Hubli and Dharwad: Unkal, Amargol, Navalur. The rai line passes through the foot of Nrupatunga Hills, beside Garment industries, etc.

The twin cities are on track to become the first city in the country to have a Light Rail Transit (LRT) alongside the existing Bus Rapid Transit System (BRTS) if all goes according to plan.

== Demographics ==
The population of the twin cities as per Census 2011 is 943,788 and is urban. Hubli–Dharwad's population increased by 22.99% between 1981 and 1991, from 527,108 to 648,298, and by 21.2% between 1991 and 2001. The municipality covers 202.3 km^{2} (78.1 sq mi).

Population Growth of Hubli–Dharwad
Year	Pop.	±%
1901	81,143	—
1911	91,031	+12.2%
1921	100,992	+10.9%
1931	124,398	+23.2%
1941	143,504	+15.4%
1951	196,180	+36.7%
1961	248,489	+26.7%
1971	379,166	+52.6%
1981	527,108	+39.0%
1991	648,298	+23.0%
2001	786,195	+21.3%
2011	943,788	+20.0%
Source: Census of India

Population Growth of Hubli
Year	Pop.	±%
1901	59,913	—
1911	61,440	+2.5%
1921	66,772	+8.7%
1931	83,494	+25.0%
1941	95,512	+14.4%
1951	129,609	+35.7%
1961	171,326	+32.2%
2001	533,820	+211.6%
2011	668,449	+25.2%
Source: Census of India

Population Growth of Dharwad
Year	Pop.	±%
1901	21,230	—
1911	29,591	+39.4%
1921	34,220	+15.6%
1931	40,904	+19.5%
1941	47,992	+17.3%
1951	66,571	+38.7%
1961	77,163	+15.9%
2001	252,375	+227.1%
2011	275,339	+9.1%
Source: Census of India ref name="popu-history" />

== Climate ==
Hubli–Dharwad has been ranked 22nd best "National Clean Air City" under (Category 2 3-10L Population cities) in India in 2024.

=== Religion ===
Religions in Hubli-Dharwad (2011)
Religion	Percent
Hinduism	67.44%
Islam	27.15%
Christianity	2.79%
Jainism	1.61%
Other or not stated	1.01%

At the time of the 2011 census, over two thirds of the population were Hindus. Over a quarter were Muslim, the largest minority religion. Small minorities of Christians and Jains also live here.

== Administration ==
=== Hubli–Dharwad Municipal Corporation ===
Hubli-Dharwad Municipal Corporation is the municipal corporation for twin cities of Hubli and Dharwad in Karnataka state in India. It was constituted in 1962 by combining the two cities separated by a distance of 20 kilometres. The area covered by the corporation is 202.3 km^{2} (78.1 sq mi) spread over 45 revenue villages. The population of the twin cities as per the 2011 census is 943,788 of which 474,518 are males and 469,270 are female. Total literates are 727,103 of which 382,913 are males while 344,190 are female. The average literacy rate of Hubli and Dharwad city is 86.79 per cent, of which male and female literacy was 91.12 and 82.44 per cent, respectively. Hubli–Dharwad's population increased 22.99% between 1981 and 1991, from 527,108 to 648,298, and by 21.2% between 1991 and 2001. The municipality covers 191 km^{2} (74 sq mi).

== Economy ==
=== Industrial and business development ===
Hubli–Dharwad is the third fastest growing city and developing industrial hub in Karnataka after the state capital, with more than 1000 allied small and medium industries established in Gokul Road and Tarihal regions of Hubli. There are machine tools industries, electrical, steel furniture, food products, rubber and leather industries, and tanning industries.

To promote the overall economic development of industries, institutions and businesses, the Karnataka Chamber of Commerce & Industry was formed. It is one of the premier associations, which has been gaining momentum in achieving potential growth and prosperity in Hubli region. One key aspect of industrialisation for Hubli-Dharwad was foundation of Agricultural Produce Market Committees (APMCs), which aimed at providing hassle-free market conditions for farmers, to establish regulated and stimulated production of agricultural related commodities and goods.

== Transport ==
=== Air ===
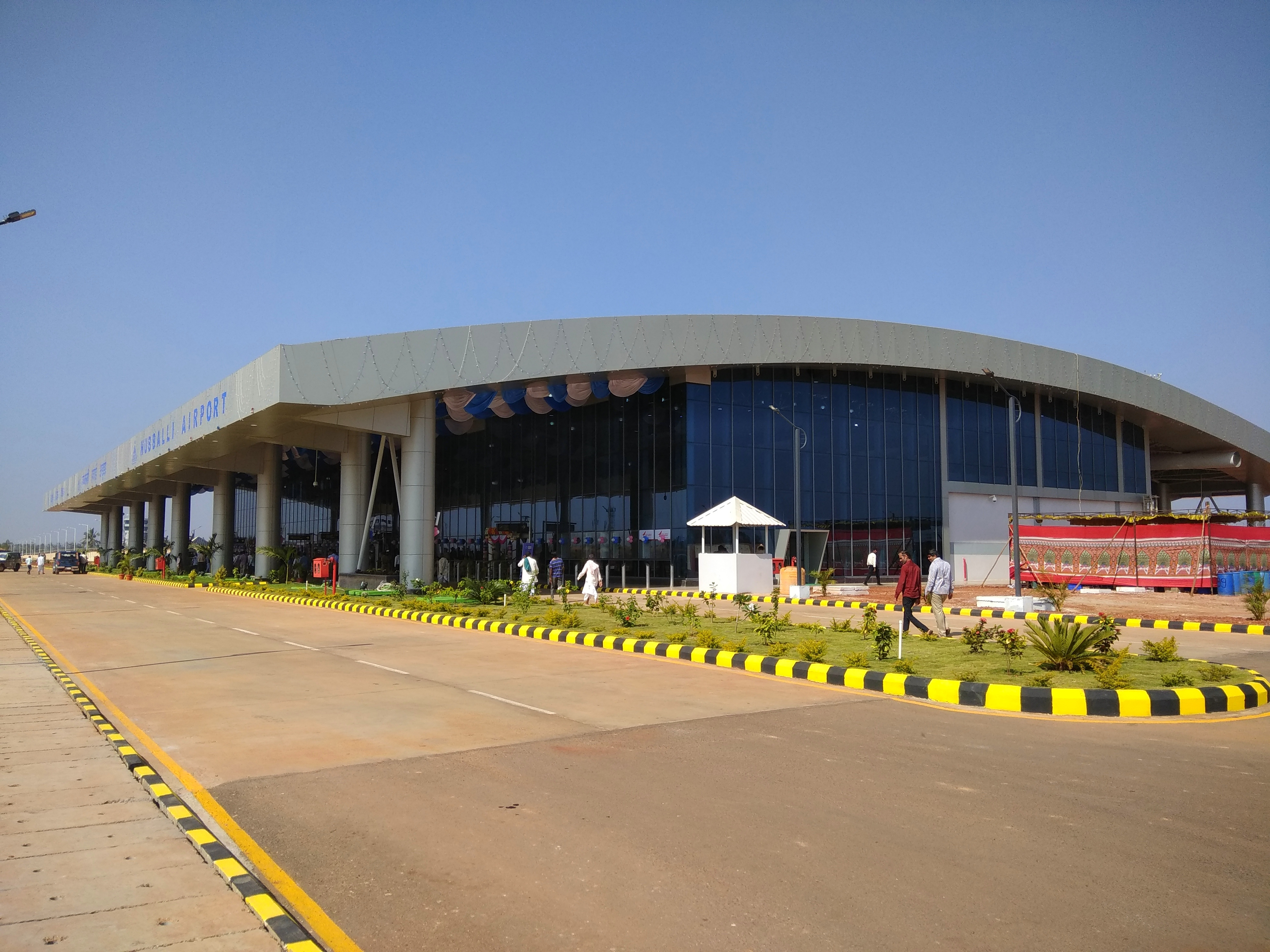
Hubli Airport

Hubli Airport (IATA: HBX, ICAO: VOHB) is a domestic airport serving the twin cities of Hubli-Dharwad and North Karnataka in the state of Karnataka, India. It is situated on Gokul Road, 8 kilometres from the city center and 20 km (12 mi) from Dharwad. It is the third busiest airport in Karnataka and the 45th busiest airport in India. In March 2020, Hubli airport received the best airport award under government of India's Regional connectivity scheme. Hubli airport connects to 10 destinations throughout the country. Efforts are being taken to upgrade it to international standards.

=== Rail ===
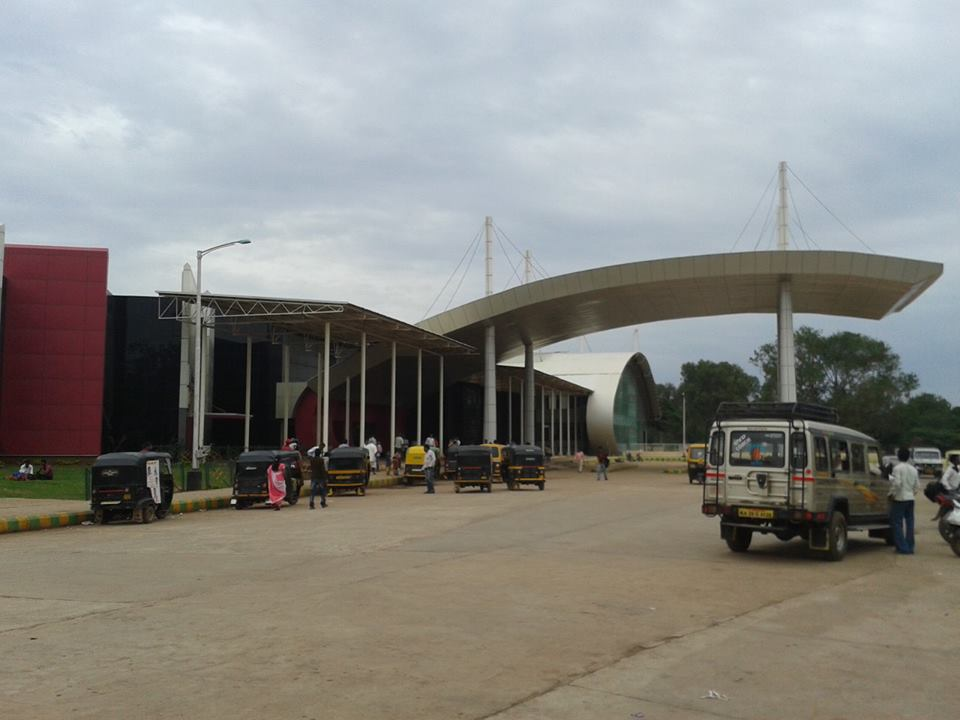
SSS Hubballi Junction Railway Station

The city currently has four stations and one Junction. The Hubli Junction railway station is the main railway station in the city with a built-up area of 161460 sq. ft. The other stations are Hubli South, Hubli East, Unkal, and Amargol. Hubli is the headquarters of the South Western Railway zone. It was carved out as a zone from the current South Central Railway. It is the centre for the Hubli Division. The Hubli Division is one of the highest revenue-generating divisions in India. Hubli is well-connected by the Indian Rail Network. Hubli, an important railway junction, has trains connecting with major cities like Mumbai, New Delhi, Varanasi, Hyderabad, Tirupati, Vijaywada, Kolkata, Chennai Rameshwaram etc. In November 2019, the work for extending a platform was undertaken by the Railways at the estimated cost of 90 Cr. According to railway officials, the length of the renewed platform is estimated at 1,400 meters, which would be longest in the world. The work is scheduled to be completed by the end of 2020. Hubli also has a Heritage Rail museum. The Indian Railways currently has 11 railway museums across the country. For bringing glory to the proposed Rail Museum, narrow-gauge Railway Rolling Stocks, from different Railways are being displayed and work is moving at a rapid pace. It is proposed to collect photographs of Rail network going back to the 19th and early 20th century so that all old memories of Rail Journey can be part of the photo gallery in the proposed Rail Heritage Museum.

=== Road ===
Hubli lies on the "Golden Quadrilateral". Asian Highway 47 passes through Hubli. It lies on National Highway 63 (Ankola–Gooty) and National Highway 218 (Hubli–Humnabad), which connect Hubli with major cities in the region. NWKRTC (North West Karnataka Road Transport Corporation) is a state-run corporation headquartered at Hubli. A semi ring road connecting NH4 (Mumbai-Chennai), NH67 (Ankola–Gooty) and NH218 (Hubli–Humnabad) with cloverleaf junction at Gabbur is already under construction.

==== Hubli-Dharwad Bus Rapid Transit System ====
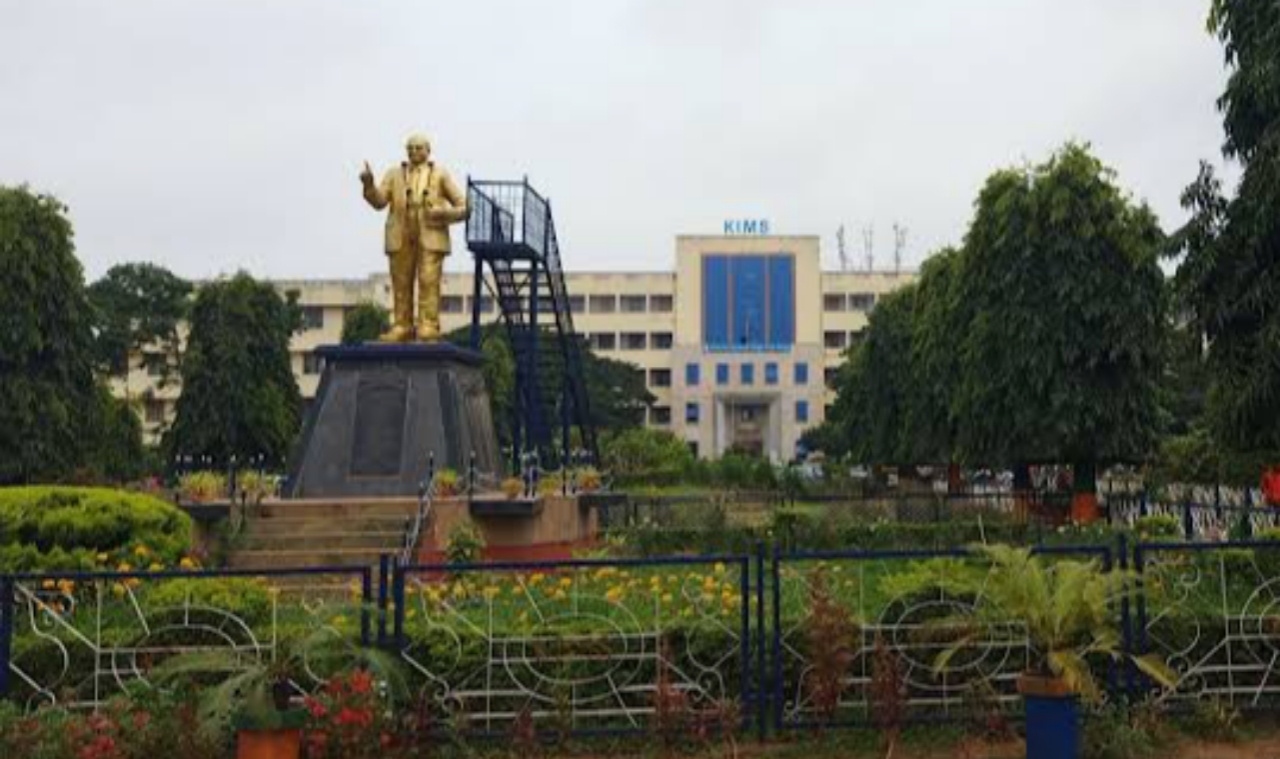
Karnataka Medical College and Research Institute

Hubli-Dharwad BRTS (also known as HDBRTS) is a bus rapid transit system built to serve the twin cities of Hubli and Dharwad, located in the North-Western part of Karnataka state in India. Hubli-Dharwad BRTS (HDBRTS) project is a Government of Karnataka initiative to foster long-term economic growth in the region. The project promotes fast, safe, comfortable, convenient and affordable public transportation between the twin cities and aims to reduce congestion and air pollution in the region.

The length of the Hubli-Dharwad BRTS corridor is 22.25 km (13.83 mi) from CBT Hubli to CBT–Dharwad with the width of the cross-sections ranging from 44 to 35 m (144 to 115 ft). The BRTS corridor includes segregated bus lanes, access-controlled bus stations, physical and fare integration with BRT feeder services, off-board ticketing through smart cards and bar-coded paper tickets, intelligent transport system and high-quality buses (Standard AC buses). The corridor is designed for operating regular and express services. It consists of two lanes for BRTS buses on either side of the median bus station facilitating overtaking lanes for express services. Foot overbridges at six locations, PELICAN signals, and synchronised signal management are proposed to facilitate the easy approach of passengers to bus stations.

== Education ==
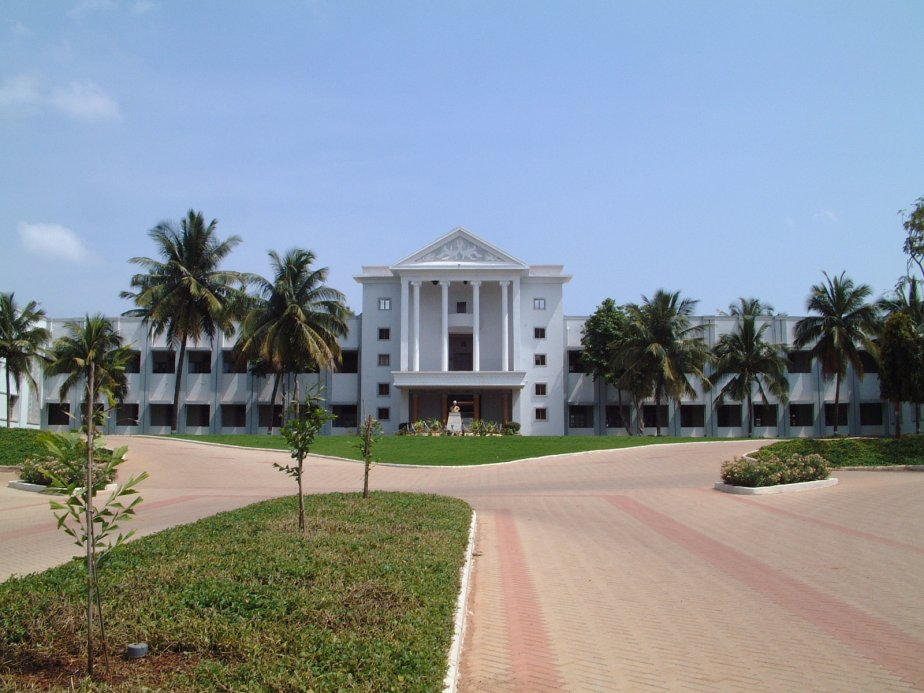
KLE Technological University

Hubli, along with Dharwad, its twin city, is an education center in Karnataka, housing several educational institutions including one of the best medical colleges in Karnataka and also one of the IITs and one of the IIITs:

- Karnataka Institute of Medical Sciences, Hubli, set up in 1957; also houses one of the largest hospitals in India and is one of the top three Govt. Medical Colleges in Karnataka
- Indian Institute of Technology Dharwad, set up in 2016, is the first IIT of Karnataka
- Indian Institute of Information Technology, Dharwad, was set up in 2015 and is the first IIIT of North Karnataka
- KLE Technological University, set up in 1947
- KLE Institute of Technology, set up in 2008
- Dakshina Bharat Hindi Prachar Sabha, Dharwad set up in 1918, was recognised by the Indian Government as one of the Institutes of National Importance in 1964
- Karnataka University, Dharwad, a major university in Karnataka, set up in 1949
- Karnataka State Law University, Hubli; all the law colleges in Karnataka are regulated from here
- Karnataka Institute for DNA Research
- Sri Dharmasthala Manjunatheshwara College of Engineering and Technology, Dharwad set up in 1979
- University of Agricultural Sciences, Dharwad, set up in 1986

== Notable people ==
North Karnataka is known for Hindustani music. Dharwad district has produced national and international level Hindustani musicians like Mallikarjun Mansur, Gangubai Hangal, and winner of the Bharat Ratna award, Pandit Bhimsen Joshi.

=== Award winners ===
The national level award winners:

==== Jnanapeeth Award winners ====
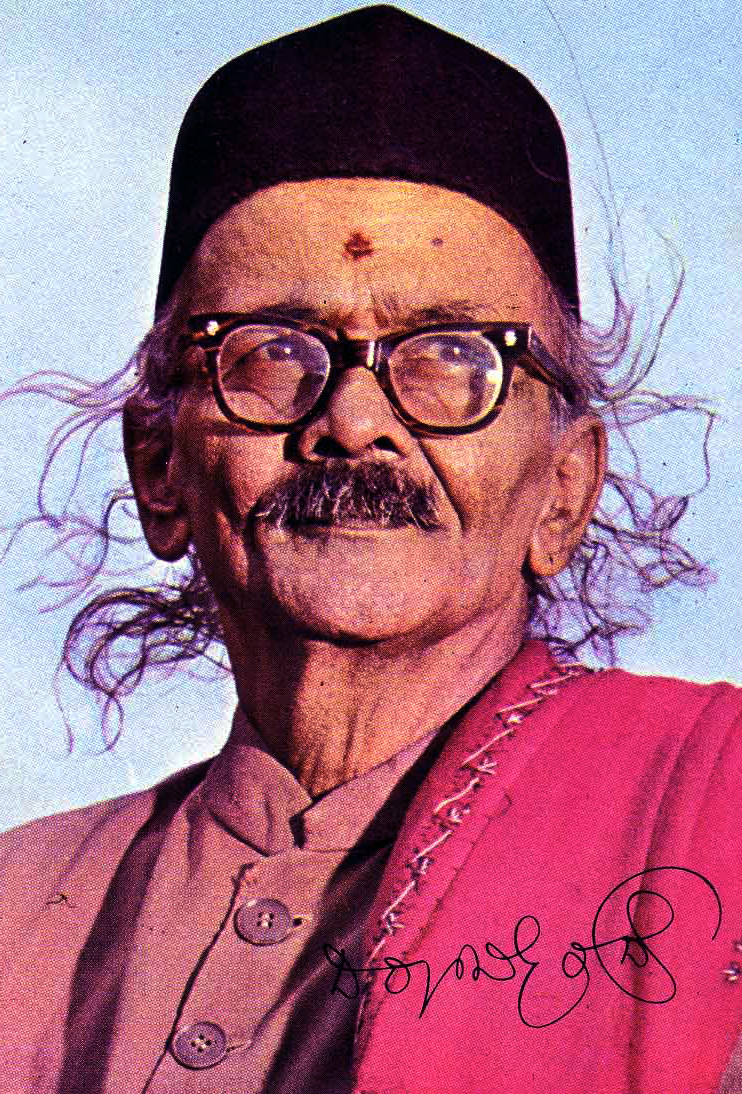
D R Bendre

The Jnanapeeth Award is one of the most prestigious literary honours in the country.

- D. R. Bendre
- Vinayaka Krishna Gokak
- Girish Karnad

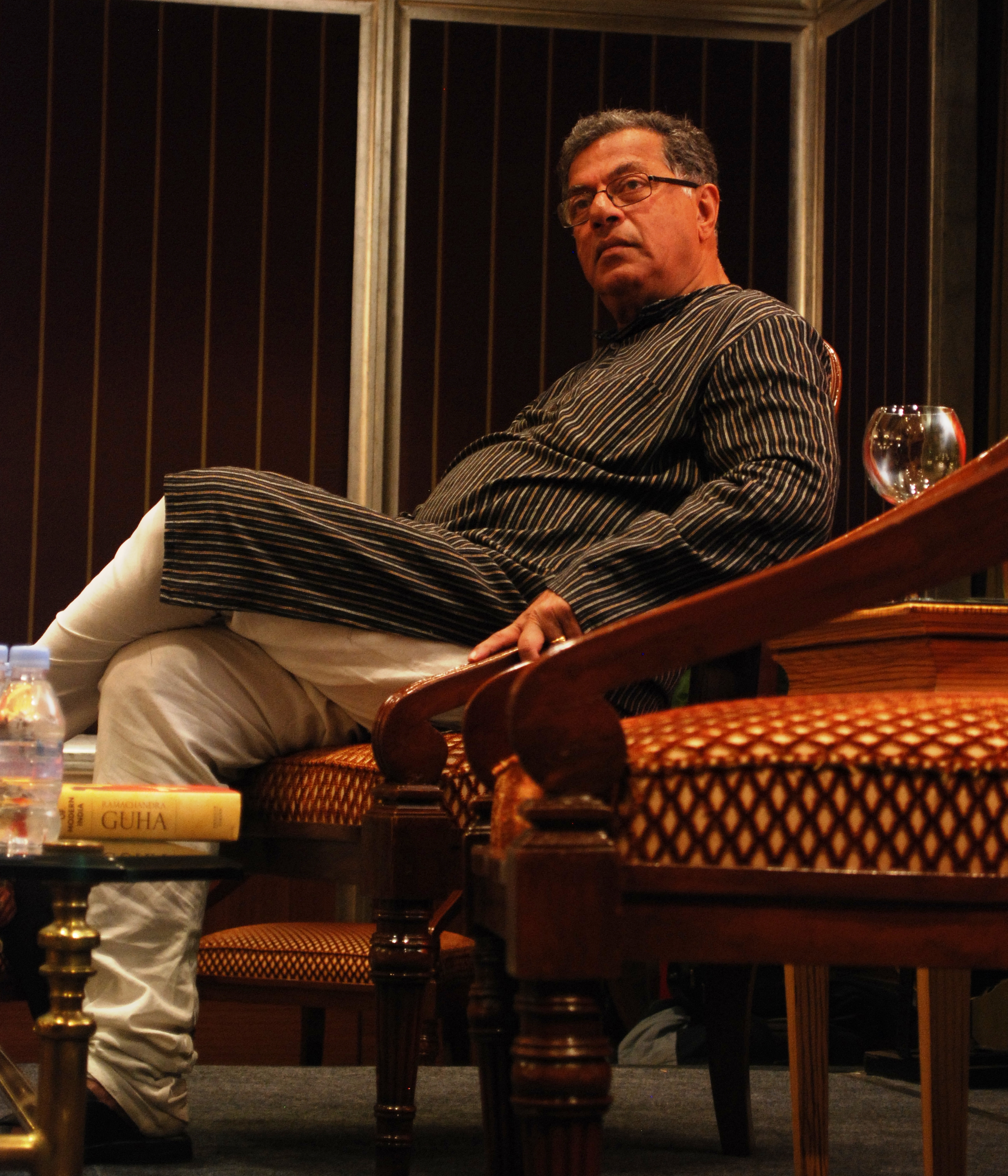
Girish Karnad

==== Bharat Ratna ====
- Bhimsen Joshi

==== Padma Award winners ====
===== Padma Bhushan =====
- Gangubai Hangal
- Mallikarjun Mansur
- Basavaraj Rajguru
- Bhimsen Joshi

===== Padma Vibhushan =====
- Mallikarjun Mansur
- Gangubai Hangal
- Bhimsen Joshi

===== Padma Shri Award =====
- Mallikarjun Mansur
- D. R. Bendre
- Vijay Sankeshwar
- Basavaraj Rajguru
- Dr. Mahipati M. Joshi
- Dr. R. B. Patil
- Bhimsen Joshi

==== President of India's Award for Sanskrit ====
- V. R. Panchamukhi

=== Other notable people ===
==== Musicians ====
- Kumar Gandharva
- Sawai Gandharva
- Venkatesh Kumar

==== Artists ====
- Shanta Hublikar
- Leena Chandavarkar
- V. K. Gokak

==== Writers ====
- Patil Puttappa
- Narayanacharya
- Sudha Murthy
- G. A. Kulkarni
- C. P. Siddhashrama

==== Business people ====
- Rai Saheb Ganpatrao Narayanrao Madiman (1879–1947): Businessman and banker
- Gururaj Deshpande: Founder of Sycamore Networks
- Vijay Sankeshwar: Founder and owner of VRL Group
- Sudha Murthy: co-founder of Infosys
- Nandan Nilekani: co-founder of Infosys
