= Karnataka Institute for DNA Research =

Medical research facility at Karnatak University, Dharwar, Karnataka, India

Coordinates: 15.43952°N 74.98353°E

- Type: Autonomous
- Location: Dharwad, Karnataka, India
- Campus: Urban
- Website: kidnar.ac.in

The Karnataka Institute for DNA research (KIDNAR) is an autonomous medical institution at Karnatak University, Dharwad.

== History ==
The department of Applied genetics of Karnatak University received a research grant of 4.10 crores from Department of Medical Education and Higher Education, Government of Karnataka to establish a Research Center for DNA Diagnostics. The Primary objective of the research Center was to undertake research in to the molecular diagnosis of genetic disorders prevalent in parts of Karnataka.

In 2013, the research center was renamed as Karnataka Institute for DNA research and was given the status of an autonomous institution by the state government. Approval to start DNA Fingerprinting service was given at KIDNAR which can reduce the dependency on Centre for DNA Fingerprinting and Diagnostics and Centre for Cellular and Molecular Biology for Karnataka Police.

== Research ==
Presently, the KIDNAR is engaged in research into the molecular diagnosis of hemophilia, thalassemia, breast cancer, Parkinson's disease, hypercholesterolemia and different types of leukemia. Additionally KIDNAR hosts Center of Excellence in Molecular Hemato-Oncology.
