= List of metropolitan areas in India =

As per the Constitution of India, a metropolitan area is defined as an area having a population of 10 lakh or more, comprised in one or more districts, and consisting of two or more municipalities or panchayats or other contiguous areas, specified by the Governor by a public notification to be a Metropolitan area.

== List ==
The list is updated for cities wherever metropolitan area data is available with the corresponding sources. All population data correspond to the 2011 census. For regions that were expanded post-2011 and no updated population data is available, data corresponding to the old urban area limits as per the 2011 census has been considered.

Metropolitan area	State/UT	Image	Population	Area (km^{2})	Source
National Capital Region	Delhi, Haryana, Rajasthan, Uttar Pradesh		58,150,000	55,083	
Mumbai	Maharashtra		23,598,000	6,328	
Kolkata	West Bengal		15,870,000	1,876	
Chennai	Tamil Nadu		12,288,000 (Note: As per the 2011 census, population corresponding to the pre-expansion limits was about 8.9 million. The population estimate corresponding to the post-expansion limits was given as 12.288 million (based on the 2011 census) by CMDA.)	5,904	
Bangalore	Karnataka		11,490,000	8,005	
Hyderabad	Telangana		9,600,000	7,257	
Pune	Maharashtra		7,276,000	7,256	
Andhra Pradesh Capital Region	Andhra Pradesh		5,873,588 (Note: Population corresponds to pre-expansion limits)	8,603	
Ahmedabad	Gujarat		6,357,693	1,866	
Surat	Gujarat		4,591,246	722	
Visakhapatnam	Andhra Pradesh		4,070,000	7,323	
Jaipur	Rajasthan		3,073,350	484.64	
Lucknow	Uttar Pradesh		2,902,920	1,150	
Kanpur	Uttar Pradesh		2,920,067	301.16	
Nagpur	Maharashtra		2,497,870	3,567	
Coimbatore	Tamil Nadu		2,467,000	1,531.57	
Salem	Tamil Nadu		2,290,024	1,265.20	
Madurai	Tamil Nadu		2,263,115	1,254.93	
Kochi	Kerala		2,119,724	440	
Ludhiana	Punjab		2,029,000	1,182.58	

== See also ==
- List of cities in India by population
- List of million-plus urban agglomerations in India
- List of states and union territories of India by population
- Demographics of India
