= List of states and union territories of India by population =

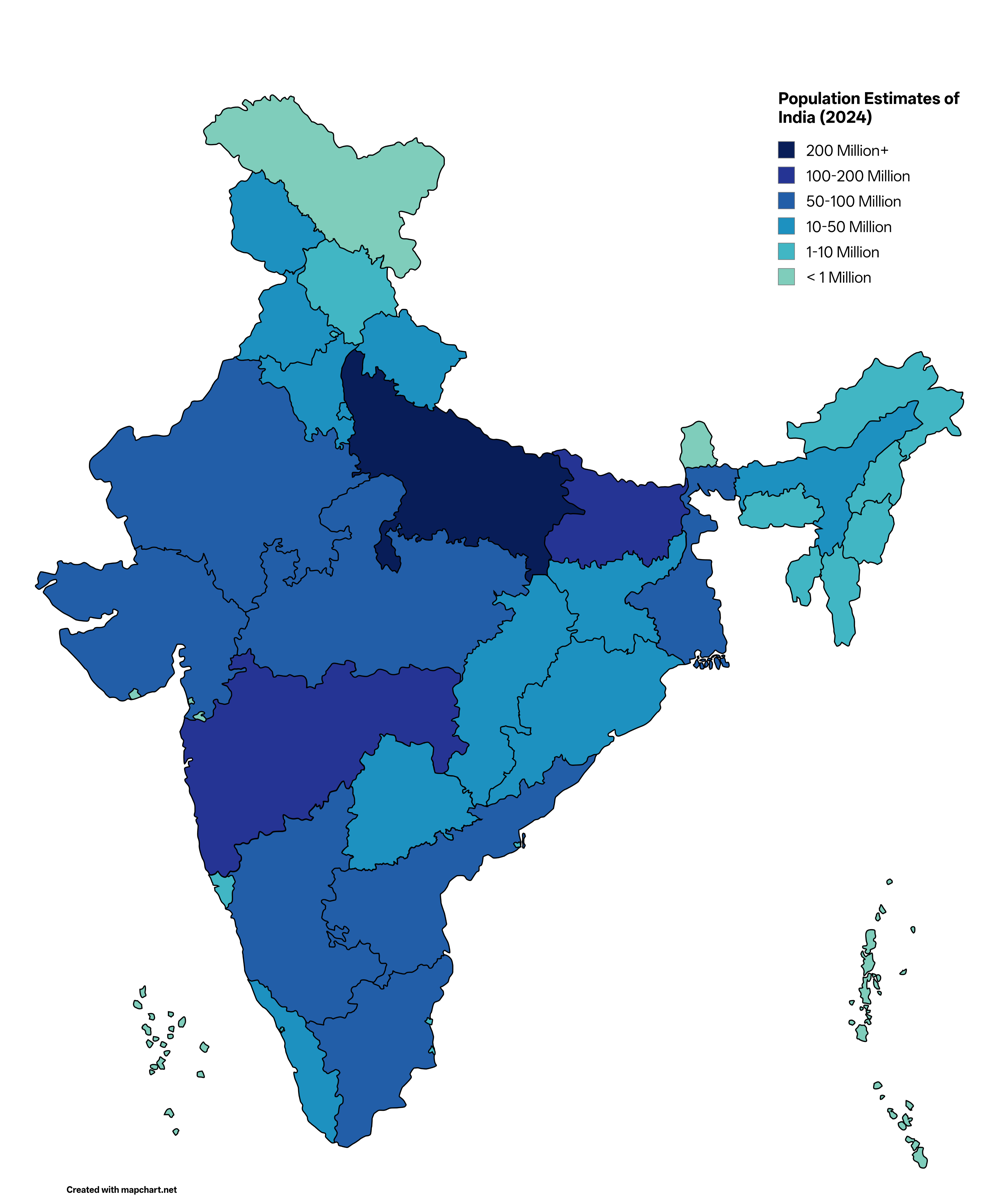
Population Estimates of India (2024)

India is a union consisting of 28 states and 8 union territories. As of 2026, with an estimated population of 1.47 billion, India is the world's most populous country. India occupies 2.4% of the world's area and is home to 17.5% of the world's population. The Indo-Gangetic Plain has one of the world's biggest stretches of fertile not-deep alluvium and are among the most densely populated areas of the world. The eastern and western coastal regions of Deccan Plateau are also densely populated regions of India. The Thar Desert in western Rajasthan is one of the most densely populated deserts in the world. The northern and north-eastern states along the Himalayas contain cold arid deserts with fertile valleys. These states have relatively low population density due to indomitable physical barriers.

== Census of India ==
A map of India's population density, 2001

The first population census in British India was conducted in 1872. Since India's independence in 1947, a census has been conducted every 10 years, the first occurring in 1951. The census in India is conducted by the Office of the Registrar General and Census Commissioner under the Ministry of Home Affairs, and is one of the largest administrative tasks conducted by a federal government.

The latest population figures are based on data from the 2011 census of India. During the decade of 2001–2011, India's annual population growth rate has slowed down from 2.15 percent to 1.76 percent. Based on decennial census data, Dadra and Nagar Haveli and Daman and Diu has the fastest growth rate of 55.1 percent, followed by Meghalaya (27.8 percent) and Arunachal Pradesh (25.9 percent). Nagaland recorded the lowest growth rate of -0.5 percent.

India has 641,000 inhabited villages and 72.2 percent of the total population reside in these rural areas. Of them 145,000 villages have population size of 500–999 persons; 130,000 villages have population size of 1000–1999 and 128,000 villages have population size of 200–499. There are 3,961 villages that have a population of 10,000 persons or more. India's 27.8 percent urban population lives in more than 5,100 towns and over 380 urban agglomerations.

From 1991 to 2001, migration to major cities caused rapid increase in urban population. On the basis of net migrants by last residence during the past decade, Maharashtra had most immigration with 2.3 million, followed by National Capital Territory of Delhi (1.7 million), Gujarat (0.68 million) and Haryana (0.67 million). Uttar Pradesh (−2.6 million) and Bihar (−1.7 million) topped the list for interstate emigration. The five states of Uttar Pradesh, Maharashtra, Bihar, West Bengal and Madhya Pradesh account for almost half (47.90 percent) of the total Indian population.

While the national average for the sex ratio shows an increase from 933 in 2001 to 940 in 2011, the 2011 census shows a sharp decline in the child sex ratio, the number of females per thousand males in a population between age group 0–6 years. States such as Punjab, Haryana, Himachal Pradesh, Gujarat, Tamil Nadu, Mizoram and Andaman and Nicobar Islands recorded an increase in India's child sex ratio. The national child sex ratio has declined from 927 in 2001 to 914 in 2011. Telangana census was separated from Andhra Pradesh state census figures, after Telangana was officially formed on 2 June 2014.

== List ==
Data from Government of India Unique Identification Authority of India Report circa October 31st 2024 Aadhaar Card Saturation Report and 2011 Census for Rural Population (population density is rounded to the nearest integer)

List of states and union territories of India by population (Population number as of Oct 31st, 2024, Rural population from 2011 Census of India)
Rank	State or Union Territory	Population (2024)	% India (2024)	Density 2024 (per km^{2})	2023 Population estimate	2011 Census Population	Growth (2001–2012)	Rural pop. (2011 Census)		Urban pop. (2011 Census)		Area (Km)	Density 2011 (per km^{2}) (Note: For determining population density of India and the State of Jammu and Kashmir, the data excludes areas claimed by India but controlled by Pakistan (78,114 km^{2}) and China (5,180 km^{2} in Shaksgam Valley and 37,555 km^{2} under Aksai Chin and other areas).)	Sex ratio (females per 1000 males, 2011)
Rank	State or Union Territory	Population (2024)	% India (2024)	Density 2024 (per km^{2})	2023 Population estimate	2011 Census Population	Growth (2001–2012)	Nos.	%	Nos.	%	Area (Km)	Density 2011 (per km^{2})	Sex ratio (females per 1000 males, 2011)
1 (S1)	Uttar Pradesh	241,066,874	17.22%	1,000	235,687,000	199,812,341	20.2%	155,317,278	77.73%	44,495,063	22.27%	240,928	828	912
2 (S2)	Bihar	128,592,000	9.19%	1,365	126,756,000 (Note: Population as per Bihar's caste census finished in Oct 2023 was 130,725,310)	104,099,452	25.4%	92,341,436	88.71%	11,758,016	11.29%	94,163	1,102	918
3 (S3)	Maharashtra	127,528,000	9.11%	414	126,710,000	112,374,333	16%	61,556,074	54.78%	50,818,259	45.22%	307,713	365	929
4 (S4)	West Bengal	99,563,000	7.11%	1,122	99,084,000	91,276,115	13.8%	62,183,113	68.13%	29,093,002	31.87%	88,752	1,029	953
5 (S5)	Madhya Pradesh	87,610,000	6.26%	284	86,579,000	72,626,809	20.3%	52,557,404	72.37%	20,069,405	27.63%	308,252	236	931
6 (S6)	Rajasthan	81,897,000	5.85%	239	81,025,000	68,548,437	21.3%	51,500,352	75.13%	17,048,085	24.87%	342,239	201	928
7 (S7)	Tamil Nadu	77,089,000	5.51%	592	76,860,000	72,147,030	15.6%	37,229,590	51.6%	34,917,440	48.4%	130,060	555	996
8 (S8)	Gujarat	72,367,000	5.17%	368	71,507,000	60,439,692	19.3%	34,694,609	57.4%	25,745,083	42.6%	196,244	308	919
9 (S9)	Karnataka	68,115,000	4.87%	355	67,692,000	61,095,297	15.6%	37,469,335	61.33%	23,625,962	38.67%	191,791	319	973
10 (S10)	Andhra Pradesh	53,340,000	3.81%	327	53,156,000	49,577,103	11.0%	34,966,693	70.53%	14,610,410	29.47%	162,970	303	993
11 (S11)	Odisha	46,566,000	3.33%	299	46,276,000	41,974,219	14.0%	34,970,562	83.31%	7,003,656	16.69%	155,707	269	978
12 (S12)	Jharkhand	39,963,000	2.86%	501	39,466,000	32,988,134	22.4%	25,055,073	75.95%	7,933,061	24.05%	79,716	414	948
13 (S13)	Telangana	38,272,000	2.73%	341	38,090,000	35,003,674	13.58%	21,395,009	61.12%	13,608,665	38.88%	112,077	312	988
14 (S14)	Assam	36,047,000	2.58%	459	35,713,000	31,205,576	17.1%	26,807,034	85.9%	4,398,542	14.1%	78,438	398	958
15 (S15)	Kerala	35,920,000	2.57%	924	35,776,000	33,406,061	4.9%	17,471,135	52.3%	15,934,926	47.7%	38,852	859	1,084
16 (S16)	Punjab	30,926,000	2.21%	614	30,730,000	27,743,338	13.89%	17,344,192	62.52%	10,399,146	37.48%	50,362	551	895
17 (S17)	Chhattisgarh	30,524,000	2.18%	226	30,180,000	25,545,198	22.6%	19,607,961	76.76%	5,937,237	23.24%	135,192	189	991
18 (S18)	Haryana	30,573,000	2.18%	691	30,209,000	25,351,462	19.9%	16,509,359	65.12%	8,842,103	34.88%	44,212	573	879
19 (UT1)	Delhi	21,752,000	1.55%	14,667	21,359,000	16,787,941	21.2%	419,042	2.5%	16,368,899	97.5%	1,483	11,297	868
20 (UT2)	Jammu and Kashmir	13,701,000	0.98%	247	13,603,000	12,267,032	23.6%	9,064,220	73.89%	3,202,812	26.11%	55,538	297	890
21 (S19)	Uttarakhand	11,755,000	0.84%	219	11,637,000	10,086,292	18.8%	7,036,954	69.77%	3,049,338	30.23%	53,483	189	963
22 (S20)	Himachal Pradesh	7,505,000	0.54%	135	7,468,000	6,864,602	12.9%	6,176,050	89.97%	688,552	10.03%	55,673	123	972
23 (S21)	Tripura	4,184,000	0.3%	399	4,147,000	3,673,917	14.8%	2,712,464	73.83%	961,453	26.17%	10,486	350	960
24 (S22)	Meghalaya	3,379,000	0.24%	151	3,349,000	2,966,889	27.9%	2,371,439	79.93%	595,450	20.07%	22,429	132	989
25 (S23)	Manipur (Note: Excludes Mao-Maram, Paomata, and Purul sub-divisions of Senapati district of Manipur.)	3,253,000	0.23%	146	3,223,000	2,570,390	24.5%	1,793,875	69.79%	776,515	30.21%	22,327	122	992
26 (S24)	Nagaland	2,253,000	0.16%	136	2,233,000	1,978,502	−0.6%	1,407,536	71.14%	570,966	28.86%	16,579	119	931
27 (S25)	Goa	1,583,000	0.11%	428	1,575,000	1,458,545	8.2%	551,731	37.83%	906,814	62.17%	3,702	394	973
28 (S26)	Arunachal Pradesh	1,576,000	0.11%	19	1,562,000	1,383,727	26.0%	1,066,358	77.06%	317,369	22.94%	83,743	17	938
29 (UT3)	Puducherry	1,391,163	0.1%	2,839	1,646,000	1,247,953	28.1%	395,200	31.67%	852,753	68.33%	490	2,598	1,037
30 (S27)	Mizoram	1,250,000	0.09%	59	1,238,000	1,097,206	23.5%	525,435	47.89%	571,771	52.11%	21,081	52	976
31 (UT4)	Chandigarh	1,243,000	0.09%	10,903	1,231,000	1,055,450	17.2%	28,991	2.75%	1,026,459	97.25%	114	9,252	818
32 (S28)	Sikkim	695,000	0.05%	98	689,000	610,577	12.9%	456,999	74.85%	153,578	25.15%	7,096	86	890
33 (UT5)	Dadra and Nagar Haveli and Daman and Diu	657,587	0.05%	1,090	1,263,000	585,764	55.1%	243,510	41.57%	342,254	58.43%	603	970	711
34 (UT6)	Andaman and Nicobar Islands	404,000	0.03%	49	403,000	380,581	6.9%	237,093	62.3%	143,488	37.7%	8,249	46	876
35 (UT7)	Ladakh	302,000	0.02%	1.8	300,000	274,000	17.8%	43,840	16%	230,160	84%	166,698	2.8	853
36 (UT8)	Lakshadweep	69,000	0.005%	2,156	69,000	64,473	6.3%	14,141	21.93%	50,332	78.07%	32	2,013	946
Total	India	1,399,754,750	100%	426	1,388,163,000	1,210,854,977	17.7%	833,463,448	68.84%	377,106,125	31.16%	3,287,469	382	943

== See also ==
- Geography of India
- List of city districts by population density
- List of metropolitan areas in India
- List of states and union territories of India by area
