= 2021 Karnataka local elections =

Elections in the Indian state

2011 Karnataka local elections
- 3 September

All elected seats in the local bodies

Elections to Local Bodies in Karnataka are conducted once in five years to elect the representatives to the Urban and Rural local bodies. These elections are conducted by Karnataka State Election Commission

Elections were held in Karnataka on 3 September 2021 for the chairs and council members of all local bodies in the state. To the three levels of urban local bodies.

== Urban Local bodies ==
=== Schedule ===
The schedule of the election was announced by the State Election Commission on 11 August 2021. It announced that polling would be held in a single phase on 3 September and that results would be declared on 6 September. It also declared that the provisions of the Model Code of Conduct "came into force with immediate effect" with the said announcement.

Event	Date	Day
Date for Notification	16 August 2021	Monday
Last date for filing nominations	23 August 2021	Monday
Date for scrutiny of nominations	24 August 2021	Tuesday
Last date for withdrawal of candidatures	26 August 2021	Thursday
Date of poll	3 September 2021	Sunday
Date of repoll (If necessary)	5 September 2021	Sunday
Date of counting	6 September 2021	Monday
Date before which the election shall be completed	6 September 2021	Monday

=== City Corporations (Mahanagara Palikes) ===
==== Number of Contestants ====
Candidates at City Corporations
Sl No	District	Local Body Name	Total Wards	Candidates by Party															Total
Sl No	District	Local Body Name	Total Wards	BJP	INC	JD (S)	BSP	CPM	AAP	UPP	AIMIM	SDPI	KRSP	KSS	WPI	IUML	KJSP	Independent	Total
1	Belagavi	Belagavi City Corporation	58	55	45	11	0	0	27	1	7	1	0	0	0	0	0	238	385
2	Dharwad	Hubballi-Dharwad Mahanagara Palike	82	82	82	49	7	1	41	11	12	4	4	4	0	0	1	122	420
3	Kalaburagi	Kalaburagi City Corporation	55	47	55	45	6	2	26	0	20	10	4	0	1	1	0	83	300
Total			195	184	182	105	13	3	94	12	39	15	8	4	1	1	1	443	1105

==== Results ====
Results at City Corporations
Sl No	District	Local Body Name	Total Wards	Polling booths	Number of Voters				Results by Party	Total					Poll Percentage
Sl No	District	Local Body Name	Total Wards	Polling booths	Male	Female	Third gender	Total	Results by Party	BJP	INC	JD (S)	AIMIM	Independent	Poll Percentage
1	Belagavi	Belagavi City Corporation	58	415	213,526	214,838	0	428,364	50.41	35	10	0	1	12	58
2	Dharwad	Hubballi-Dharwad City Corporation	82	837	403,497	407,954	86	811,537	53.81	39	33	1	3	6	82
3	Kalaburagi	Kalaburagi City Corporation	55	533	258,775	260,543	146	519,464	49.40	23	27	4	0	1	55
Total			195							97	70	5	4	19	195

=== City Municipal Councils (Nagarasabhes) ===
==== Poll Percentage ====
Poll Percentage in City Municipal Councils
Sl No	District	Local body Name	Total Wards	Polling booths	Number of Voters				Poll Percentage	Ward Number
Sl No	District	Local body Name	Total Wards	Polling booths	Male	Female	Third gender	Total	Poll Percentage	Ward Number
1	Bengaluru Rural	Doddaballapura City Municipal Council	31	63	33,016	33,191	0	66,207	75.80	1 to 31
2	Bidar	Bidar City Municipal Council	2	10	5,065	4,923	3	9,991	68.13	26
2	Bidar	Bidar City Municipal Council	2	10	5,065	4,923	3	9,991	68.13	32
3	Shivamogga	Bhadravathi City Municipal Council	1	4	1,878	1,857	0	3735	64.27	29

=== Town Municipal Council (Purasabhe) ===
==== Poll Percentage ====
Poll Percentage in Town Municipal Council
Sl No	District	Local body Name	Total Wards	Polling booths	Number of Voters				Poll Percentage
Sl No	District	Local body Name	Total Wards	Polling booths	Male	Female	Third gender	Total	Poll Percentage
1	Chikkamagaluru	Tarikere Town Municipal Council	23	28	14,313	14,977	0	29,290	74.22

=== By Polls ===
==== Poll Percentage ====
Poll Percentage and Results in Urban Local bodies By Polls
Sl No	District	Local body Name	Local body type	Poll Percentage	Total Wards	Ward Number	Results by Party			
Sl No	District	Local body Name	Local body type	Poll Percentage	Total Wards	Ward Number	BJP	INC	JD (S)	Independent
1	Mysuru	Mysuru City Corporation	City Corporation	64.49	1	36		1		
2	Bagalkote	Mudhol City Municipal Council	City Municipal Council	60.72	1	18	1			
3	Bagalkote	Bilagi Town Panchayat	Town Panchayat	70.76	1	14		1		
4	Bagalkote	Mahalingapura Town Municipal Council	Town Municipal Council	81.37	1	3				1
5	Bagalkote	Terdal Town Municipal Council	Town Municipal Council	73.92	1	3	1			
6	Kodagu	Somwarpet Town Panchayat	Town Panchayat	73.05	2	1	2			
6	Kodagu	Somwarpet Town Panchayat	Town Panchayat	73.05	2	3	2			
7	Kodagu	Virajpet Town Panchayat	Town Panchayat	76.47	1	13	1			
8	Uttara Kannada	Dandeli City Municipal Council	City Municipal Council	56.62	1	11		1		
9	Kalaburagi	Wadi Town Municipal Council	Town Municipal Council	53.26	2	4			2	
9	Kalaburagi	Wadi Town Municipal Council	Town Municipal Council	53.26	2	23			2	
10	Bidar	Basavakalyan City Municipal Council	City Municipal Council	67.49	2	11	1			
10	Bidar	Basavakalyan City Municipal Council	City Municipal Council	67.49	2	23		1		
11	Kolar	Robertsonpet City Municipal Council	City Municipal Council	73.64	1	12		1		
12	Davanagere	Harihar City Municipal Council	City Municipal Council	66.82	1	14			1	
13	Belagavi	Raibag Town Panchayat	Town Panchayat	73.68	1	9				1
14	Belagavi	Saundatti Town Municipal Council	Town Municipal Council	80.88	1	23		1		
15	Koppal	Kustagi Town Municipal Council	Town Municipal Council	75.42	1	16	1			
16	Gadag	Mulagunda Town Panchayat	Town Panchayat	79.59	1	18		1		
17	Ramanagara	Ramanagara City Municipal Council	City Municipal Council	70.09	1	4		1		
18	Vijayapura	Basavana Bagewadi Town Municipal Council	Town Municipal Council	73.67	1	21				1

== See also ==
- Elections in India
- 2018 elections in India
- 2018 Karnataka Legislative Assembly election
