= HDMC =

HDMC may refer to:

== Military ==
- Higher Defence Management Course at the College of Defence Management

== Government ==
- Hubli-Dharwad Municipal Corporation, City governing body of Hubli-Dharwad in the Indian state of Karnataka
