= Panchayati raj in India =

Village self-government system in rural India

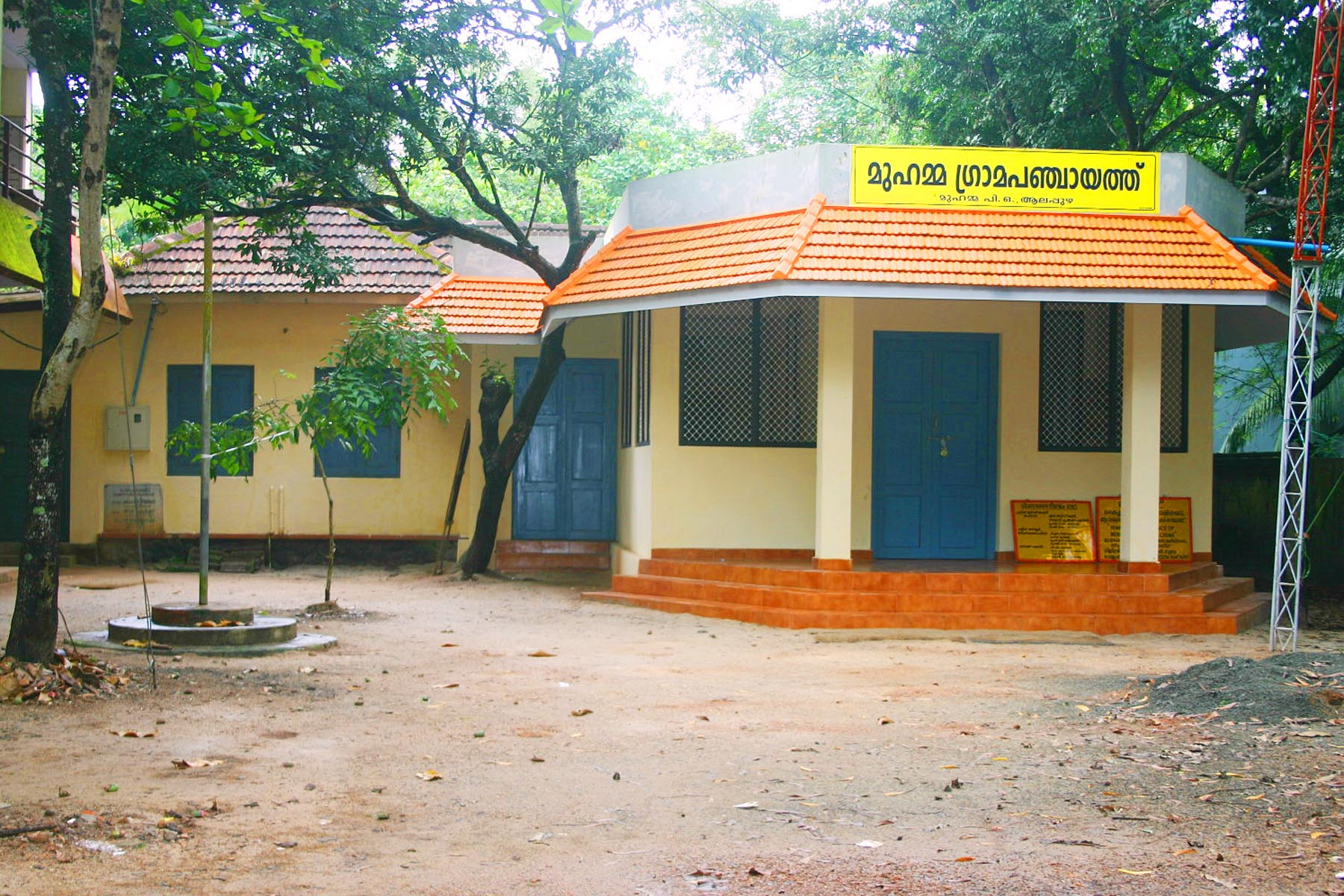
Muhamma Panchayat office, Kerala

Panchayati raj (lit. 'council of five officials') is the system of local self-government of villages in rural India as opposed to urban and suburban municipalities.

It consists of the Panchayati Raj Institutions (PRIs) through which the self-government of villages is realized. They are tasked with "economic development, strengthening social justice and implementation of Central and State Government Schemes including those 29 subjects listed in the Eleventh Schedule" of the Indian constitution

Part IX of the Indian Constitution is the section of the Constitution relating to the Panchayats. It stipulates that in states or Union Territories with more than two million inhabitants there are three levels of PRIs:

- the gram panchayat at village level
- the panchayat samiti (block samiti, mandal parishad) at block level, and
- the zilla panchayat (district council) at district level.

In states or Union Territories with less than two million inhabitants there are only two levels of PRIs. The Gram Panchayat consists of all registered voters living in the area of a Gram Panchayat and is the organization through which village inhabitants participate directly in local government. Elections for the members of the Panchayats at all levels take place every five years. By federal law, the Panchayats must include members of Scheduled Castes (SCs) and Scheduled Tribes (STs) in the same proportion as in the general population and at least one-third of all seats and chairperson posts must be reserved for women. Some states have increased the required minimum proportion for women to one-half.

Jawaharlal Nehru inaugurated Panchayat at Nagaur on 2 October 1959. The day was selected on the occasion of Mahatma Gandhi's birthday. Gandhi wanted Gram Swaraj through Panchayati Raj. The system was modified in 1992 with the 73rd constitutional amendment.

In India, the Panchayati Raj now functions as a system of governance in which gram panchayats are the basic units of local administration. Currently, the Panchayati Raj system exists in all states except Nagaland, Meghalaya, and Mizoram, and in all Union Territories except Delhi.

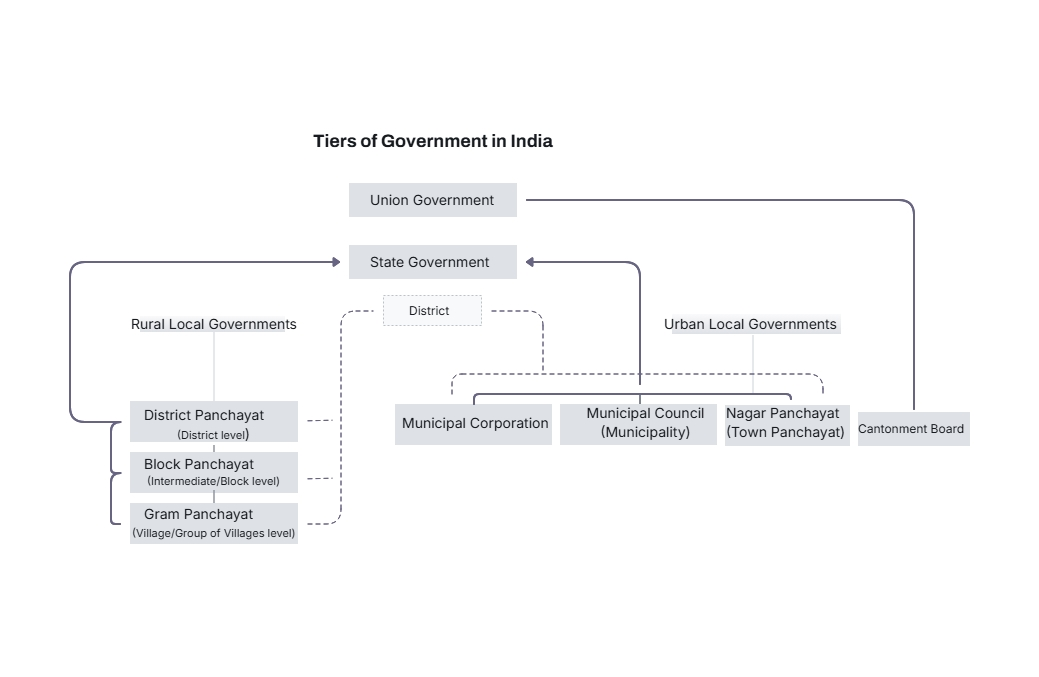
Tiers of Government in India

== History ==
Panchayati raj has its origins in India since Vedic period (1700 BCE). Since Vedic times, the village (gram) in the country is considered as the basic unit for regional self-administration.

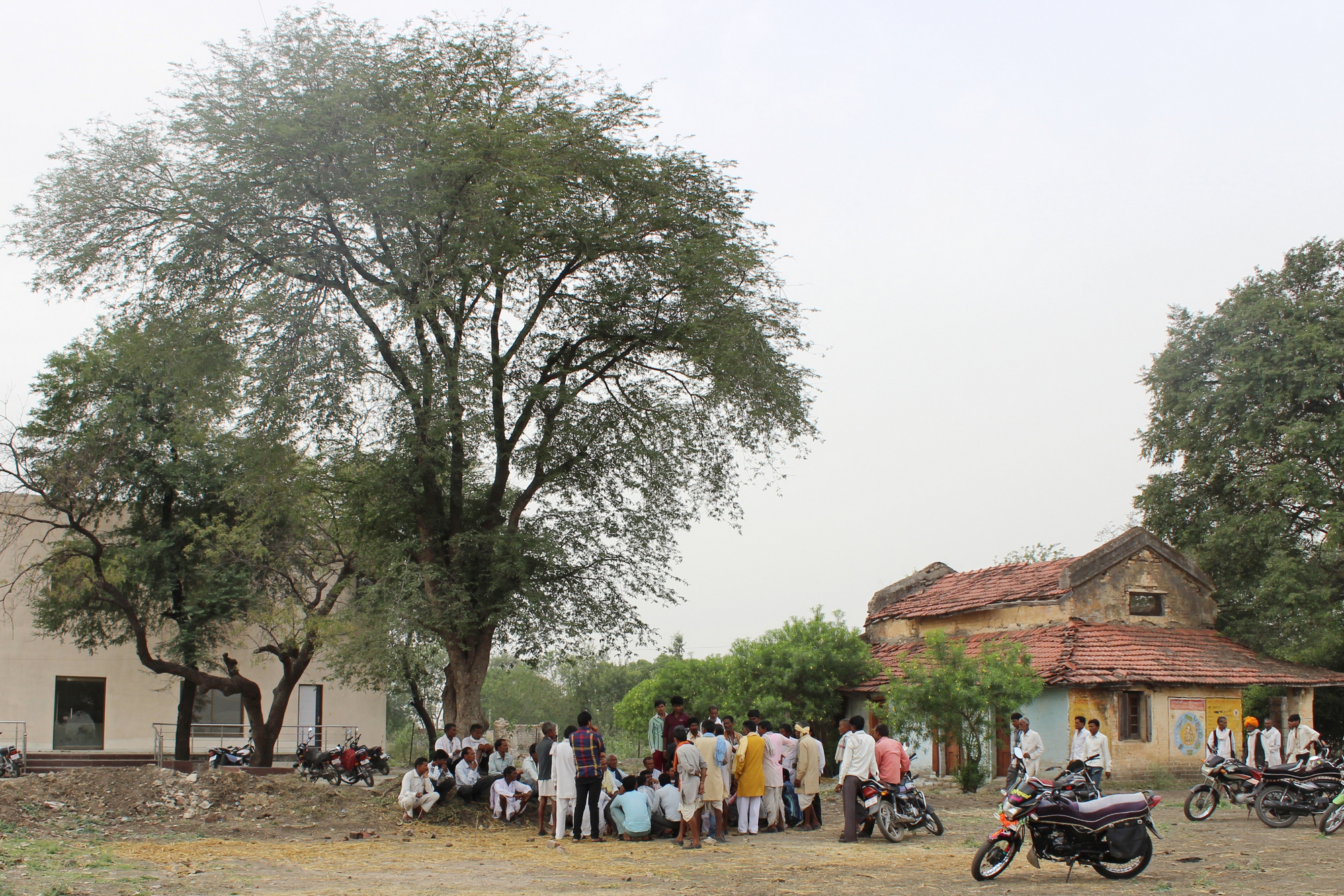
Open Panchayat near Narsingarh, Madhya Pradesh

Mahatma Gandhi advocated Panchayati Raj as the foundation of India's political system, as a decentralized form of government in which each village would be responsible for its own affairs. The term for such a vision was Gram Swaraj ("village self-governance"). Instead, India developed a highly centralized form of government. However, this has been moderated by the delegation of several administrative functions to the local level, empowering elected gram panchayats. There are significant differences between the traditional Panchayati Raj system, that was envisioned by Gandhi, and the system formalized in India in 1992.

Jawaharlal Nehru inaugurated Panchayati at Nagaur on 2 October 1959. The day was selected on the occasion of Mahatma Gandhi's birthday. Gandhi wanted Gram Swaraj through Panchayati Raj. Rajasthan was the first state to implement it. Nehru inaugurated Panchayat Raj in Andhra Pradesh on 11 October 1959 on the occasion of Dussehra. The system was gradually established all over India. The system was modified in 1992 with the 73rd constitutional amendment.

The Balwant Rai Mehta Committee, headed by the Member of Parliament Balwantrai Mehta, was a committee appointed by the Government of India in January 1957 to examine the work of the Community Development Programme (1952) and the National Extension Service (1953), to suggest measures to improve their work. The committee's recommendation was implemented by NDC in January 1958, and this set the stage for the launching of Panchayati Raj Institutions throughout the country. The committee recommended the establishment of the scheme of 'democratic decentralization', which finally came to be known as Panchayati Raj. This led to the establishment of a three-tier Panchayati Raj system: Gram Panchayat at the village level, Panchayat Samiti at the block level, and Zila Parishad at the district level.

On 24 April 1993, the Constitutional (73rd amendment) Act of 1992 came into force in India to provide constitutional status to the Panchayati Raj institutions. This amendment was extended to Panchayats in the tribal areas of eight states, namely: Andhra Pradesh, Gujarat, Himachal Pradesh, Maharashtra, Madhya Pradesh, Odisha, and Rajasthan beginning on 24 December 1996. This amendment contains provisions for the devolution of powers and responsibilities to the panchayats, both for the preparation of economic development plans and social justice, as well as for implementation in relation to 29 subjects listed in the eleventh schedule of the constitution, and the ability to levy and collect appropriate taxes, duties, tolls and fees. The Act aims to provide a three-tier system of Panchayati Raj for all states having a population of over two million, to hold Panchayat elections regularly every five years, to provide seats reserved for scheduled castes, scheduled tribes and women, to appoint a State Finance Commission to make recommendations regarding the financial powers of the Panchayats, and to constitute a District Planning Committee.

== Three-tier panchayat system ==
The three-tier panchayat system was inaugurated in June 1973 by the West Bengal Panchayat Act passed that year. This system was adopted into the Constitution of India by the 73rd Amendment in 1992. This system is in place in most states of India and the union territory of Andaman & Nicobar Islands. It consists of:

- Gram panchayats
- Panchayat samitis
- Zilla panchayats

=== Nomenclature ===
In different parts of India, the levels of panchayati raj institutions might have different names because of the various languages spoken and cultural differences. However, they usually represent the village, block, and district levels and similar in nature.

==== District Council ====
Zilla Parishad, Zila Parishad, Zilla Panchayat, District Panchayat, etc.

==== Block Panchayat ====
Panchayat Samiti, Panchayat union, Mandal Parishad, Mandal Praja Parishad, Anchalik Panchayat, Janpad Panchayat, Kshetra Panchayat, Taluka Panchayat, etc.

==== Village Panchayat ====
Gram Panchayat, Gaon Panchayat, etc.

== Two-tier panchayat system ==
The earliest panchayats in post-independence India that were created in 1948 were all two-tier structures consisting of only Gram Panchayats & Zilla Parishads. Currently, this system exists only in the union territories of Daman, Diu, Dadra & Nagar Haveli, Lakshadweep and Puduchery and also in the states of Goa, Sikkim and Manipur (all of which were formerly union territories).

== Alternatives of panchayat system ==
Areas under the Sixth Schedule to the Constitution of India are exempted from having panchayati raj structures. Instead they have other mechanisms of rural governance.

=== Meghalaya ===
In Meghalaya, the Khasi Hills Autonomous District Council, Garo Hills Autonomous District Council & Jaintia Hills Autonomous District Council act as the alternatives of zilla parishads for the Khasis, Garos and Jaintia people respectively. Khasis & Jaintia people from various villages elect a clan headman as Rangbah Shnong to head the local Dorbar Shnong (village council), while Garos elect a Nokma to administer the Akhing lands which is held in common proprietorship for jhum cultivation. These Rangbah Shnongs & Nokmas become the ex-officio members of their respective Autonomous District Councils.

=== Nagaland ===
Under Article 371A, the right of the Naga people in Nagaland to administer themselves through village-level tribal councils is protected. These tribal councils are responsible for implementation of tribal laws enacted by tribal chiefs. An attempt to introduce the 3-tier panchayati raj framework in Nagaland in 2002 was met with opposition.

=== Mizoram ===
The Lushai Hills district (Village Council) Act, 1953 replaced the traditional Mizo tribal chiefdom with elected village councils as the basic unit of rural governance. Other tribes like the Chakma, Lai & Mara people have alternative governments in the form of Chakma Autonomous District Council, Lai Autonomous District Council & Mara Autonomous District Council respectively.

== Election ==
The members at all levels of Panchayati Raj are elected directly, and the chairpersons/presidents at the intermediate and district levels are elected indirectly from among the elected members. At the village level, the chairperson/president is elected as determined by the state government. Some states use direct elections, while others use indirect elections (elected from among the members) to choose the chairperson of the gram panchayat.

For the purpose of representation, the village panchayat, block panchayat, and district panchayat are divided into constituencies/wards, each represented by an elected member. These members constitute the panchayat council. In some states, there are ex-officio members at the block or district level who are not elected members, such as MLAs, MPs, etc.

=== Duration ===
The term of Panchayati Raj Institutions at all levels is 5 years, and elections to these are conducted by the respective State Election Commission.

=== Reservation of seats ===
Reservation of seats in Panchayati Raj Institutions is a mechanism to ensure representation of marginalized and underprivileged sections of society. These reservations typically include seats for Scheduled Castes (SCs), Scheduled Tribes (STs), and women. The percentage of reserved seats varies from state to state based on demographic factors and social considerations.

== Gram panchayat sabha ==
The sarpanch (head of five) is its elected head. The members of the gram panchayat are elected directly by the voting-age village population for a period of five years. The Gram Panchayat President, also known as Sarpanch often presides over the Sabha meetings.

Elected standing committees operate in the panchayat, focusing on specific areas like finance, development, education, health, and welfare. Each committee, headed by a chairperson, comprises three to five members, ensuring representation and expertise in their respective domains.

== Block level panchayat or Panchayat Samiti ==
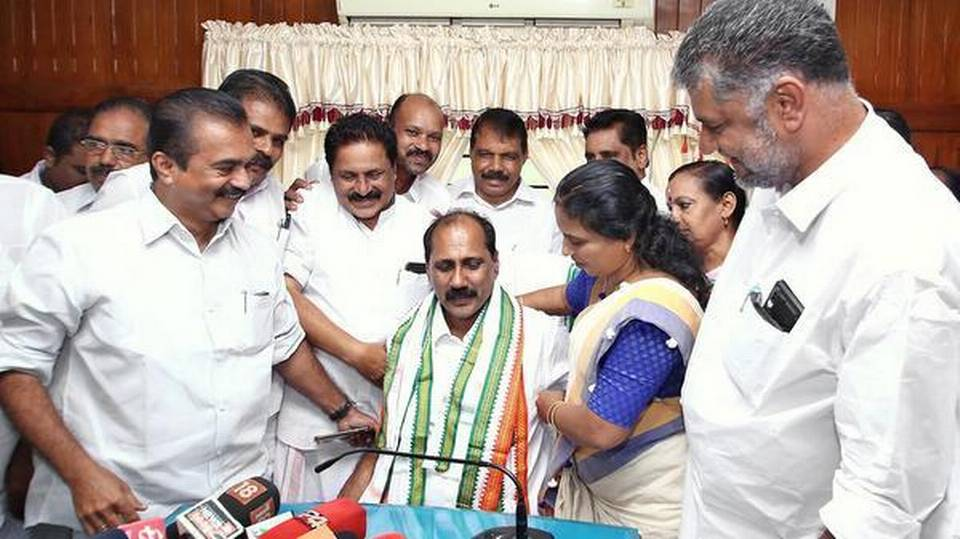
Elected panchayat president in Kottayam district.

Just as the tehsil goes by other names in various parts of India, notably mandal and taluka, there are a number of variations in nomenclature for the block panchayat. For example, it is known as Mandal Praja Parishad in Andhra Pradesh, Taluka Panchayat in Gujarat, Uratchi Onriyam in Tamil Nadu and Karnataka, and Panchayat Samiti in Maharashtra. In general, the block panchayat has the same form as the gram panchayat but at a higher level.

=== Composition ===
Membership in the block panchayat is mostly ex-official; it is composed of: all of the Sarpanchas (gram panchayat chairmen) in the Panchayat Samiti area, the MPs and MLAs of the area, the Sub-District Officer (SDO) of the sub-division, co-opt members (representatives of the SCs, STs and women), associate members (a farmer from the area, a representative of the cooperative societies and one from marketing services), and some elected members. However, in Kerala, block panchayat members are directly elected, just like gram panchayat and district panchayat members.

The Panchayat Samiti is elected for a term of five years and is headed by a chairman and a deputy chairman.

== System in practice ==
The Panchayats, throughout the years, have relied on federal and state grants to sustain themselves economically. The absence of mandatory elections for the Panchayat council and infrequent meetings of the Sarpanch have decreased the spread of information to villagers, leading to more state regulation. Many Panchayats have been successful in achieving their goals, through cooperation between different bodies and the political mobilization of previously underrepresented groups in India. There is an obstacle of literacy that many Panchayats face for engagement of villagers, with most development schemes being on paper. However, homes linked to the Panchayati Raj System have seen an increase in participation for local matters. The reservation policy for women on the Panchayat councils have also led to a substantial increase in female participation and have shaped the focus of development to include more domestic household issues.

In 1992, the 73rd amendment was passed, transforming the role of women in Panchayati raj. The 73rd amendment established reservation of one-third of seats for women in basic village councils. This reservation had led to a significant increase in women's participation in local governance. Women are now serving as elected representatives in various positions, including as sarpanch (village head) and panchayat members. Women also demonstrated their positive and enlightened thinking in the panchayat to respond to the government's expectations of women. The supportive actions from their families are encouraging women to attend every PRI (Panchayati Raj in India) meeting. Even though the bureaucracy was all male dominated, Gandhi hoped that Panchayati raj could be the framework for a free Indian political order. As a promoter of liberalism, he proposed gram swaraj, or self-contained and autonomous villages, to give women the most rights. The 73rd amendment was also resisted because reservation of seats meant that high caste people had to accept marginal caste women into the political empowerment system. Indirectly, this leads to corruption when the government devotes funds to the grassroots panchayat where resources and funds are exploited by bureaucratic channels.

== Issues ==
In Panchayati raj system there is a practice of male relatives assuming the roles of elected women, often referred to as pradhan pati (boss husband) which undermines the intent of reserving seats for women in local governance. Such incidents have been reported in multiple states of India. In March 2025 a controversy emerged in Paraswara village, Chhattisgarh, when six men took oaths of office on behalf of their wives, who had been elected as panchayat members. This incident, captured on video and widely shared on social media, led to public outrage and the suspension of the village secretary responsible for administering the oaths. For instance, in Madhya Pradesh, there have been cases where husbands or male family members took oaths in place of elected women representatives, prompting the government to consider measures to prevent such occurrences.

== See also ==
- Seventy-third Amendment of the Constitution of India
- National Panchayati Raj Day
- Local self-government in India

== Notes and references ==
=== Sources ===
- Nepal glossary, United States Library of Congress
- Article 333357, zeenews.com
- "The Pattern of Abuse - Broken People: Caste Violence Against India's 'Untouchables' (Human Rights Watch Report, 1999)". Human Rights Watch.
