= National Panchayati Raj Day =

Observance in India, 24 April

- Observed by: India
- Type: National
- Date: 24 April
- Next time: 24 April 2027
- Frequency: annual

National Panchayati Raj Day (National Local Self-Government day) is the national day of Panchayati Raj System in India celebrated by Ministry of Panchayati Raj on 24 April annually.

Panchayati Raj was constitutionalised through the 73rd Constitutional Amendment Act of 1993. The bill was passed by the Lok Sabha on 22 December 1992 and by Raj Sabha on 23 December 1992. Later it was approved by 17 state assemblies and received the assent of the President on 23 April 1993. This Act become effective on 24 April 1993.

Then, Prime Minister of India Manmohan Singh declared the first National Panchayati Raj Day on 24 April 2010. He mentioned that if Panchayati Raj institutions (PRIs) functioned properly and locals participated in the development process, the Maoist threat could be countered.

Addressing the Elected Representatives, Prime Minister Narendra Modi on 24 April 2015 called for an end to the practice of "husbands of women sarpanches" or "sarpanch pati" exercising under influence on the work of their wives elected to power.
