= Hubli Idgah Maidan dispute =

Historical and legal controversy

- Court: Supreme Court of India
- Full case name: Anjuman-e-Islam v. Hubli-Dharwad Municipal Corporation
- Decided: January 2010

Case history
- Prior actions: Trial court and Karnataka High Court ruled in favour of HDMC
- Subsequent action: Karnataka High Court declined to stay HDMC decisions on site usage (2022)

Court membership
- Judges sitting: Justice Dalveer Bhandari, Justice A.K. Patnaik

Case opinions
- Idgah Maidan is the exclusive property of HDMC; Anjuman-e-Islam holds only a licence, not a lease

The Hubli Idgah Maidan dispute is a decades-long legal and political controversy over the ownership of the Idgah Maidan (also known as Kittur Rani Chennamma Maidan), an approximately 1.5-acre plot of land in Hubli, Karnataka, India. The dispute centred on whether the Anjuman-e-Islam, a Muslim social and educational organisation, held ownership rights over the land or merely a licence to use it for prayers twice a year, as granted by the local municipality in 1921. In January 2010, the Supreme Court of India ruled that the maidan is the exclusive property of the Hubballi-Dharwad Municipal Corporation (HDMC), settling the ownership question.

The site became a major flashpoint for communal tensions in the early 1990s, during a period of heightened Hindutva mobilisation following the Ayodhya dispute. The Bharatiya Janata Party (BJP) and affiliated organisations launched a campaign to hoist the Indian tricolour at the maidan, framing it as a matter of national pride on land they contended was public property. The issue was frequently described in the media as Karnataka's "Mini-Ayodhya."

== Background ==
=== The 1921 agreement ===
The Hubli Municipality was constituted in 1920 under the Bombay Presidency. In 1921, the Anjuman-e-Islam petitioned the municipality for permission to use the Idgah Maidan for offering prayers on Eid al-Fitr and Eid al-Adha. In 1921, the municipality passed a resolution granting this permission for a period of 999 years at an annual rent of one rupee. The arrangement was subsequently confirmed by the government of the Bombay Presidency. A central legal question in later decades was whether this 1921 agreement constituted a lease — which would have implied stronger rights of possession — or merely a licence, which grants only a limited, revocable permission to use land. The distinction had significant implications for the Anjuman-e-Islam's claim to the property.

=== Construction controversy and early litigation ===
In the decades following the 1921 agreement, the Anjuman-e-Islam incrementally expanded its use of the site. In 1961, it obtained permission to construct shops on the maidan. However, a civil court ordered the demolition of these structures, a ruling that was upheld by the Karnataka High Court in 1992. The construction of a commercial complex on the land by the Anjuman-e-Islam during the 1970s–1990s further inflamed opposition and provided a concrete grievance around which political mobilisation could occur, as critics argued that a licensee had no right to build permanent structures on municipal land.

== The 1994 flag-hoisting agitation ==
The dispute escalated dramatically in the early 1990s when the BJP and Sangh Parivar organisations adopted the Idgah Maidan as a site for political agitation, demanding the right to hoist the national flag there on Independence Day. On 15 August 1994, amid a curfew imposed by the Congress government of Chief Minister Veerappa Moily and a heavy deployment of police and paramilitary forces, BJP supporters attempted to march to the maidan. Uma Bharati, a prominent BJP leader, was arrested upon arriving in Hubli. The police opened fire on protesters, resulting in the deaths of at least six people and injuries to dozens.

The incident became a powerful rallying point for the BJP in Karnataka, helping the party consolidate its support base in the North Karnataka region. The "Mini-Ayodhya" framing proved electorally effective, and the Idgah Maidan agitation is widely credited by political analysts with catalysing the BJP's rise in the state.

== Supreme Court judgment (2010) ==
After decades of litigation across multiple courts, the ownership question reached the Supreme Court. In January 2010, a bench comprising Justices Dalveer Bhandari and A.K. Patnaik dismissed the appeal filed by the Anjuman-e-Islam and issued a definitive ruling:

- The Idgah Maidan is the exclusive property of the Hubli-Dharwad Municipal Corporation.
- The 1921 agreement constitutes a licence, not a lease, granting the Anjuman-e-Islam only the right to offer prayers at the site twice a year.
- The licensee has no right to construct permanent structures on the land; the court upheld directives for the demolition of the commercial complex.

The judgment was significant in that it affirmed all previous rulings by the trial court and the Karnataka High Court, leaving no further avenue of appeal on the question of ownership.

== Subsequent developments ==
=== 2022 Ganesh Chaturthi controversy ===
In August 2022, the HDMC Commissioner granted permission for the installation of a Ganesh idol and associated festivities at the Idgah Maidan. The Anjuman-e-Islam challenged this decision before the Karnataka High Court. In a late-night hearing on 30 August 2022, Justice Ashok S. Kinagi declined to stay the HDMC's decision, observing that the property belonged to the municipal corporation and that there was no pending title dispute regarding the Hubli site. A Ganesh idol was subsequently installed at the site on 31 August 2022 under heavy police security.

== See also ==
- Ayodhya dispute
- Communalism (South Asia)
- Hubballi-Dharwad
- History of Hubli
