= Hubli-Dharwad Municipal Corporation =

Local civic body in Hubli and Dharwad, Karnataka, India

Hubali-Dharwad Municipal Corporation Hubbaḷḷi-Dhāravāḍa Mahānagara Pālike
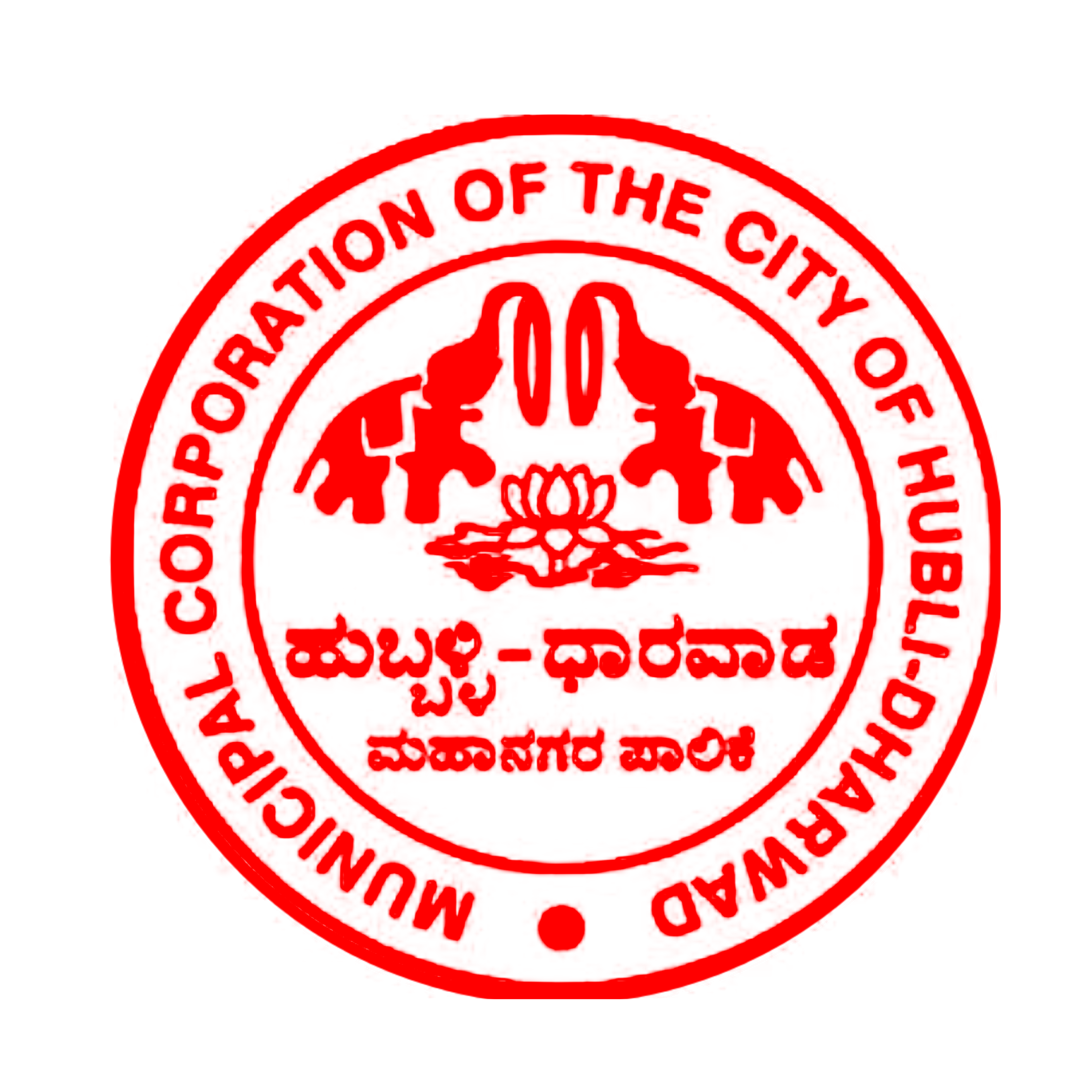

Type
- Type: Municipal Corporation

History
- Founded: 1962 (64 years ago)

Leadership
- Mayor: Bijwad Durgamma Shashikanth, BJP
- Deputy Mayor: Nazare Ratnabai Ekanath, BJP
- Leader of opposition: Mohammed iliyas Maniyar, Congress
- HDMC Commissioner 2024: Rudresh Gali

Structure
- Seats: 82
- Political groups: NDA (40): BJP (39); JD(S) (1); INC+ (33): INC (33); Others (9): IND (6); AIMIM (3)

Elections
- Voting system: First-past-the-post
- Last election: September 2021
- Next election: 2026

Meeting place
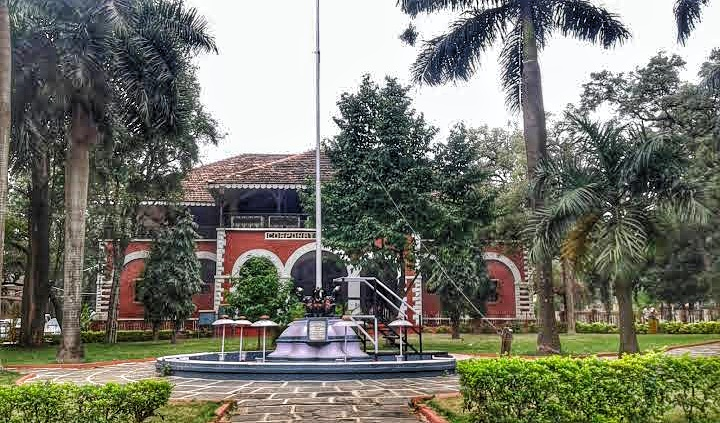
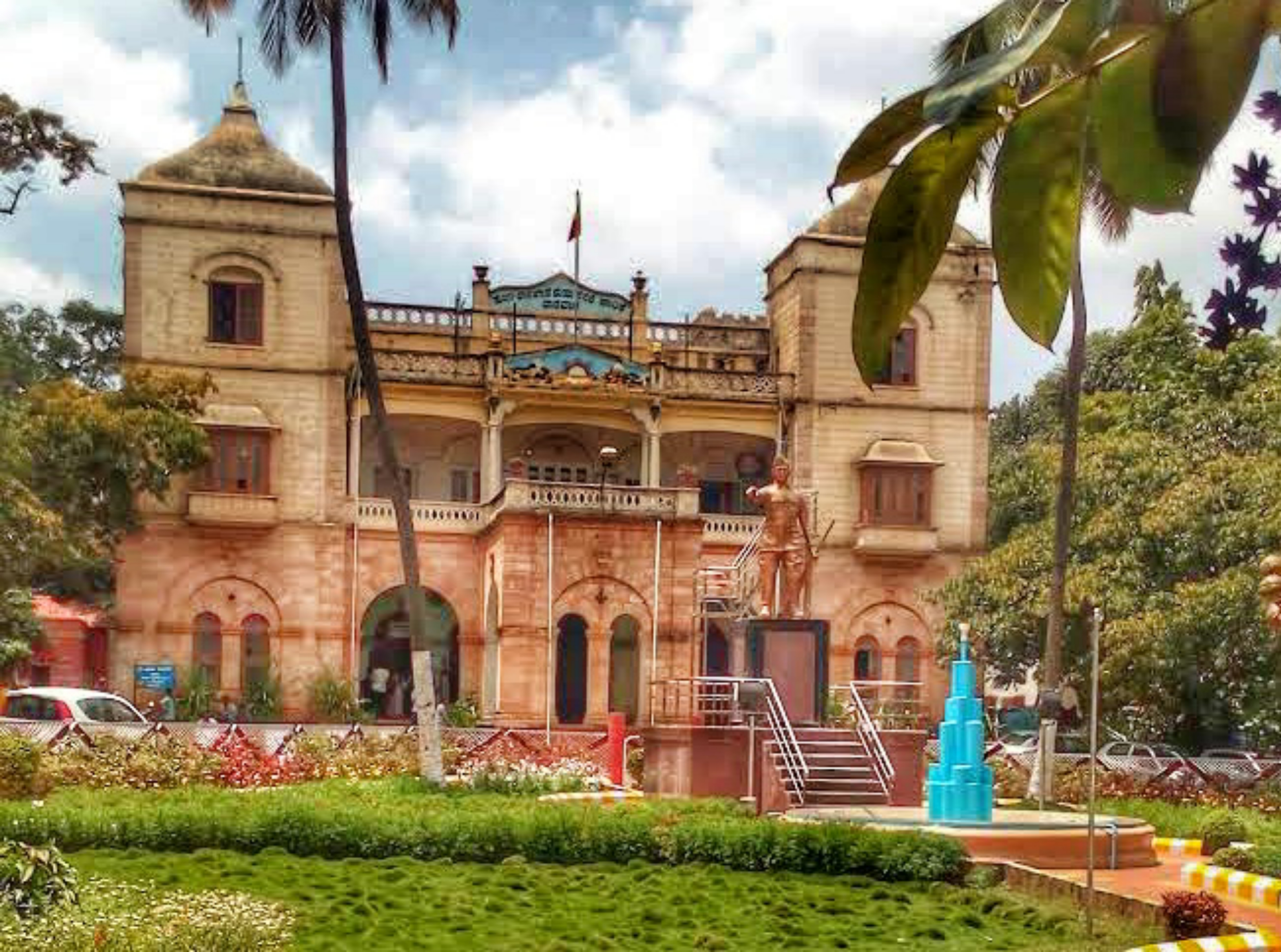
- HDMC, Hubli (left), HDMC, Dharwad (right)
- HDMC Hubli/HDMC Dharwad

Website
- HDMC

Hubli-Dharwad Municipal Corporation, also known as Municipal Corporation of the City of Hubballi-Dharward or Hubballi-Dharwad Municipal Corporation (HDMC), is the municipal corporation responsible for the civic infrastructure and administration of the twin cities of Hubli and Dharwad, located in North Western part of Karnataka state in India. The organisation is known, in short, as HDMC. This civic administrative body administers an area of 202.3 km^{2}. HDMC consists of 82 elected members from four Vidhan Sabha constituencies of Hubli-Dharwad. Presently the Council is under suspended animation pending election of new members. There has been a huge demand by people of Dharwad to create a separate civic body and get itself detached by HDMC. Claims are that most of the funds are allocated to Hubli solely.

== Overview ==
Population Growth of Hubli–Dharwad
Year	Pop.	±%
1901	81,143	—
1911	91,031	+12.2%
1921	100,992	+10.9%
1931	124,398	+23.2%
1941	143,504	+15.4%
1951	196,180	+36.7%
1961	248,489	+26.7%
1971	379,166	+52.6%
1981	527,108	+39.0%
1991	648,298	+23.0%
2001	786,195	+21.3%
2011	943,857	+20.1%
Source: Census of India

Population growth of Hubli
Year	Pop.	±%
1901	59,913	—
1911	61,440	+2.5%
1921	66,772	+8.7%
1931	83,494	+25.0%
1941	95,512	+14.4%
1951	129,609	+35.7%
1961	171,326	+32.2%
2001	533,820	+211.6%
2011	668,449	+25.2%
Source: Census of India

Population Growth of Dharwad
Year	Pop.	±%
1901	21,230	—
1911	29,591	+39.4%
1921	34,220	+15.6%
1931	40,904	+19.5%
1941	47,992	+17.3%
1951	66,571	+38.7%
1961	77,163	+15.9%
2001	252,375	+227.1%
2011	275,339	+9.1%
Source: Census of India

The total area under HDMC is 213 km^{2}. The twin cities are currently divided into 82 wards. Each ward elects a corporator. The winning party elects a council of members, who are responsible for various departments. The council members chose the Mayor among themselves. At present, there are sixty seven members in the council. The Commissioner is the highest officer of Municipal Corporate Office, who is responsible for the departments of public works, revenue and tax, water supply, planning and development, fire brigade, health and sanitation, finance and accounts etc. The current Municipal Commissioner is Ishwar Ullagaddi (KAS) while presently the municipal council is under animated suspension pending election of new members.

== History ==
Prior to incorporation of HDMC, both Hubli and Dharwad had their own municipal bodies, namely Hubli Municipal Council which was established on 15 August 1855 under the Government of India Act of 1850. Its membership was fixed at 18, including the President. The Collector of the district functioned as the President, and the members were called commissioners. The government nominated all the members. On the other hand, Dharwad Municipal Council first came into existence on 1 January 1856. The first non-official President of the Council was Shri. S.K. Rodda in 1907, and Shri. S.V. Mensinkai was nominated in the following year. But the credit of being the first elected President goes to N. G. Karigudari, who took office in 1920.

In the year 1962, a unique experiment in urban development was conducted by The Directorate of Municipal Administration, Karnataka by combining two cities separated by a distance of 20 kilometres. Thus Hubli-Dharwad Municipal Corporation was constituted.

HDMC was a key party in the Hubli Idgah Maidan dispute.

== Demographics ==
The population of the twin cities as per provisional figures of Census 2011 is 943,857 and is urban. Hubli-Dharwad's population increased by 22.99% between 1981 and 1991, from 527,108 to 648,298, and by 21.2% between 1991 and 2001. The municipality covers 213 km^{2}.

== Departments ==
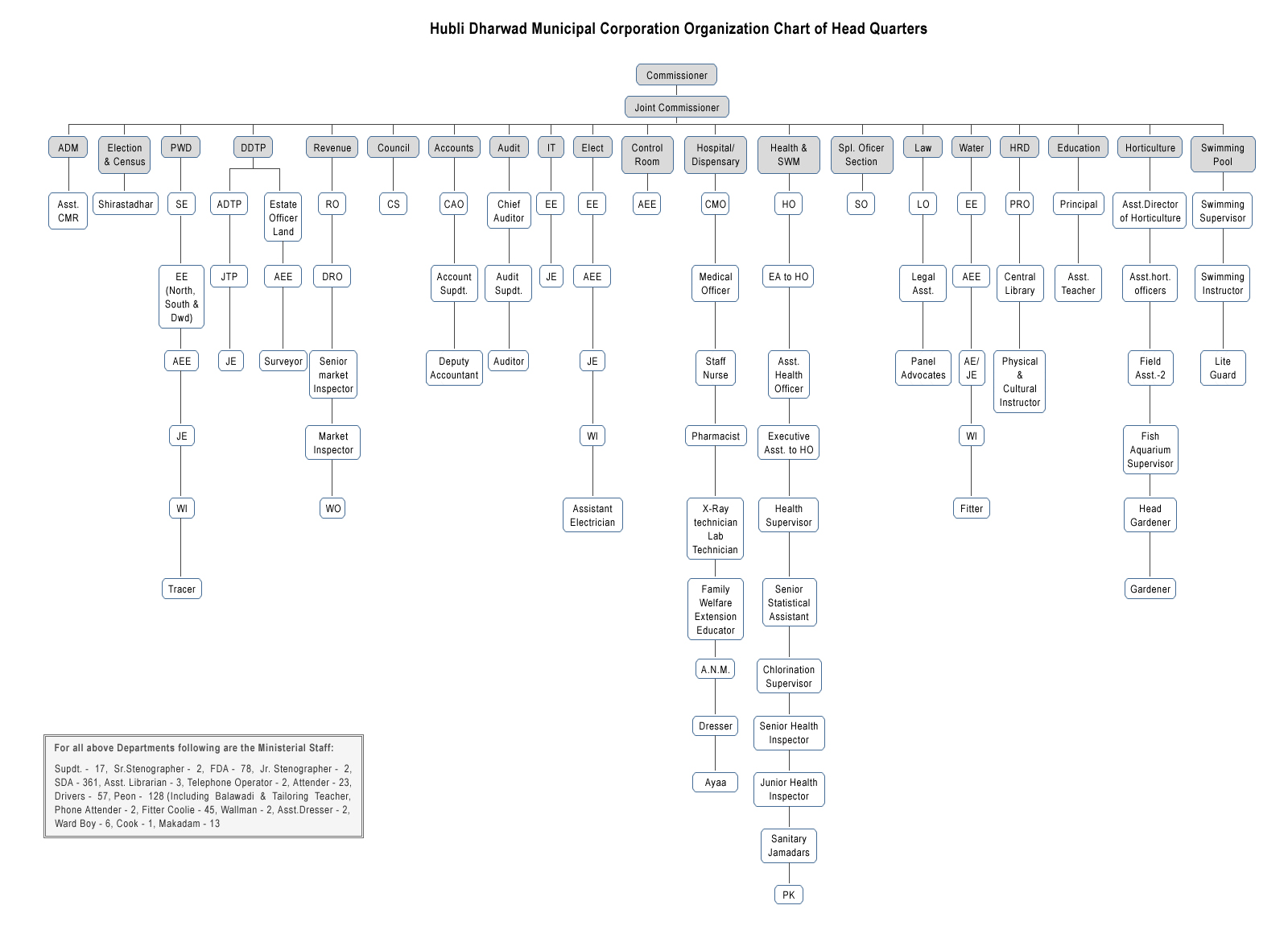
Organizational chart of Hubli-Dharwad Municipal Corporation.

- ADM
- Election and Census
- PWD
- DoTP
- Revenue
- Council
- Accounts
- Audit
- IT
- Electricity
- Control Room
- Hospital and Dispensaries
- Health and Sanitation
- Spl. Office
- Law
- Water Supply
- HRD
- Education
- Horticulture
- Swimming Pool

== Wards ==
HDMC had 67 wards from 2008 to 2018

Number of wards was increased to 82 in 2018 and first election post delimitation was held on 3 September 2021 Ward Maps were published in Dharwad district website.

Of 82 Wards, 28 belong to Dharwad and 54 are in Hubli region.

BJP emerged as single largest party in 2021 HDMC elections by winning 39 of 82 seats. INC accused AIMIM for splitting Minority votes and making way for BJP's victory. Mayor's post is reserved for Backward class A category and Deputy Mayor's Post was limited to Scheduled Castes Woman.

== Demand for separate municipal corporation for Dharwad ==
The citizens of Dharwad city accuses HDMC for biased decisions towards their area and demand for a separate municipal corporation in Dharwad by splitting from HDMC. The demand was acknowledged by Chief minister Basavaraj Bommai on 25 August 2021 who opined that Dharwad deserved a separate municipal corporation.

In July 2024 the demand for creation of an exclusive municipal corporation for Dharwad city surfaced again with citizens urging state govt to make an announcement of the same during the monsoon session of state legislature, which was on 15 July 2024.

On 2 January 2025 the Karnataka state cabinet declared the separation of Hubballi Dharwad municipal corporation, formation of new municipal corporation for the city of Dharwad.

== Functions ==
Hubli-Dharwad Municipal Corporation is created for the following functions:

- Planning for the town including its surroundings which are covered under its Department's Urban Planning Authority .
- Approving construction of new buildings and authorising use of land for various purposes.
- Improvement of the town's economic and Social status.
- Arrangements of water supply towards commercial, residential and industrial purposes.
- Planning for fire contingencies through Fire Service Departments.
- Creation of solid waste management, public health system and sanitary services.
- Working for the development of ecological aspect like development of Urban Forestry and making guidelines for environmental protection.
- Working for the development of weaker sections of the society like mentally and physically handicapped, old age and gender biased people.
- Making efforts for improvement of slums and poverty removal in the town.

== Revenue sources ==
The following are the Income sources for the Corporation from the Central and State Government.

=== Revenue from taxes ===
The following is the tax-related revenue for the corporation:

- Property tax.
- Profession tax.
- Entertainment tax.
- Grants from Central and State Government like Goods and Services Tax.
- Advertisement tax.

=== Revenue from non-tax sources ===
The following is the non-tax related revenue for the corporation:

- Water usage charges.
- Fees from Documentation services.
- Rent received from municipal property.
- Funds from municipal bonds.

== See also ==
- List of municipal corporations in India
