= Kalaburagi City Corporation =

Local government of Kalaburagi

Kalaburagi City Corporation Kalaburagi Mahānagara Pālike

Type
- Type: Municipal Corporation
- Term limits: 5 years

History
- Founded: 15 June 1965 (61 years ago)

Leadership
- Mayor: Yellappa Naikodi, INC
- Deputy Mayor: Heena Begum, INC

Structure
- Seats: 55
- Political groups: NDA (27): BJP (23); JD(S) (4); INC+ (27): INC (27); Others (1): IND (1)
- Length of term: 2021–2026

Elections
- Voting system: First-past-the-post
- Last election: September 2021
- Next election: 2026

Meeting place
- Kalaburagi, Karnataka

Website
- KCC (new) (old)

Kalaburagi City Corporation (KCC) is the municipal corporation responsible for looking after the city administration of the Indian city of Kalaburagi. Municipal Corporation mechanism in India was introduced during British Rule with formation of municipal corporation in Madras (Chennai) in 1688, later followed by municipal corporations in Bombay (Mumbai) and Calcutta (Kolkata) by 1762. It consists of a legislative and an executive body. The legislative body is headed by the city mayor while the executive body is headed by a Chief Commissioner.

== History ==
Kalaburagi City Municipal Council came into existence on 15 June 1965. Later it is upgraded as a Kalaburagi Mahanagara Palike on 2 October 1982. It is divided into 55 wards, each represented by a corporator. Elections to the corporation are held every five years and subsequently a mayor and a deputy mayor are elected. The city corporation is housed in its own premises located at Jagat Circle, public garden Kalaburagi.

== Mayor ==
Mayor's post is reserved for General category and Deputy Mayor's Post was limited to Backward class B.

== Functions ==
Kalaburagi Mahanagara Palike is created for the following functions:

- Planning for the town including its surroundings which are covered under its Department's Urban Planning Authority.
- Approving construction of new buildings and authorising use of land for various purposes.
- Improvement of the town's economic and Social status.
- Arrangements of water supply towards commercial, residential and industrial purposes.
- Planning for fire contingencies through Fire Service Departments.
- Creation of solid waste management,public health system and sanitary services.
- Working for the development of ecological aspect like development of Urban Forestry and making guidelines for environmental protection.
- Working for the development of weaker sections of the society like mentally and physically handicapped,old age and gender biased people.
- Making efforts for improvement of slums and poverty removal in the town.

== Revenue sources ==
The following are the Income sources for the Corporation from the Central and State Government.

=== Revenue from taxes ===
Following is the Tax related revenue for the corporation.

- Property tax.
- Profession tax.
- Entertainment tax.
- Grants from Central and State Government like Goods and Services Tax.
- Advertisement tax.

=== Revenue from non-tax sources ===
Following is the Non Tax related revenue for the corporation.

- Water usage charges.
- Fees from Documentation services.
- Rent received from municipal property.
- Funds from municipal bonds.
