= Doddaballapura City Municipal Council =

- City Council
- Coat of arms
- Nickname: DB Pur
- Location in Karnataka, India
- Coordinates: 13.292°N 77.543°E
- Country: India
- State: Karnataka
- District: Bangalore Rural

Government
  - Type: City Council
  - Body: Doddaballapura City Municipal Council
  - Municipal Commissioner: Sri.K.Narasimhamurthy
  - President: Shamshunnissa (JDS)
  - Councillor: City council (31+1 seats)
- Elevation: 880 m (2,890 ft)

Population (2011)
  - Total: 93,105

Languages
  - Official: Kannada
- Time zone: UTC+5:30 (IST)
- PIN: 561 203
- Telephone code: 08119
- Vehicle registration: KA-43
- Website: doddaballapurcity.gov.in

The Doddaballapur City Municipal Council (DCMC) is the administrative body responsible for the civic and infrastructural assets of the Doddaballapura City area of India.

Doddaballapur City Municipal Council is run by a city council. The city council is composed of elected representatives, called "Councillors", including one from each of the wards (localities) of the city. Elections are held once every five years. First elections to the newly created body were held in 2013.

== History ==
The town of Doddaballapura had been in existence prior to the 12th century and was named on behalf of a messenger traveling during the 10th century called "Dodda-Balla." It is older than the Bengaluru (Bangalore) city which has now overgrown engulfing many of its neighboring villages and towns. The history of municipal governance of Doddaballapura dates back to July 30, 1917, when nine leading citizens of the city formed a Municipal Board under the Improvement of Towns Act. The following year, the concept of elected representatives came into being and also saw the introduction of property tax.

Fresh elections were held in June 2013.

S.No.	Party name	Party flag or symbol	Number of Corporators (2016)	Number of Corporators (2021)
01	Janata Dal (Secular) JDS(s)		14	7
02	Bhartiya Janata Party (BJP)		06	12
03	Indian National Congress (INC)		04	9
04	Kannada Chalavali Vatal Paksha		02	
06	Others		05	3

== Wards ==
DCMC is divided into eight City municipal ward, for the ease of administration:

1. Someshwara Badavane
2. Gangadharapura
3. Muttasandra
4. Vinayaka Nagara
5. Sidhenayakana Halli
6. Muttur
7. Dargapura
8. Venkataramana Swamy devalaya
9. Sanjay Nagara
10. Veerabhadrana Palya
11. Karenahalli
12. Kanakadasa Road
13. Nekara Kaloni
14. Tubagare Pete
15. Chawdeshwari Gudi Beedi
16. Kalasi Palya
17. Kote Road
18. Kuchappana Pete
19. Maruti Vyayama Shale
20. Pinjaru Bidu
21. Hemavati Pete
22. Nagartara Pete
23. Chikka Pete
24. Vaishara Beedi
25. Yele Pete
26. Kumbara Pete
27. Maruti Nagara
28. Ganigara Pete
29. Vaddara Pete
30. Mutyalamma Devastana Road
31. Shanthi Nagara

== See also ==
- Doddaballapura
- Karnataka
