= Local government in Karnataka =

Local administrative units in Karnataka

Local government in Karnataka is the third tier constituting the three-tier administration set-up in the Indian state of Karnataka. It is a system of local government which forms the last level from the Centre.

== History ==
In ancient India, including Karnataka, despite a centralized administration under a King, there was some opportunity for local governance. This is evident from the epigraph inscriptions found across many places in Karnataka which acknowledge right to elect representatives to the assembly or Council. System similar to Panchayat Raj existed in India during Vedic period and has a History of over thousands of years. Systems similar to Grama Panchayat existed in the History with different names in different Timeline. They were called Grama Sabha, Uru, Vokkalu, Gramakaryalaya, Panchayti Kate etc.. They were headed by Urasamastaru, Oora mukhyastharu, Zameendars, Jahagirdars etc. Guidelines i.e., Constitution was compiled by the heads and were called with different names like Samaya, Sthiti, Maryade, Vyavaste, Achara vyavaste. Panchamutts (Not Matha), Agrahara, Brahmapuri, Brahmeswara Keri were the names of the areas where Brahmins resided and was headed by Mahajanaru, Oorodeya, Aiyyanavaru. Assemblies in Towns existed with names like Barabaluthi, Ayagara, Pura, Hittu, Nadu, Mahanadu, Nadagounda Pergade, Nadasabhe, Mandala, Nadu panchayati, Nyaya Samiti etc. Gaunda Prabhu, Nadashyanabogha, Nadagounda, Gouda, Heggade were the chief persons of such bodies. Nagara Mahajana, Pattana shetty, Pattanaswamy, Pattanavergade, Gowda Pattana swamy were the patriarchs of larger Urban areas namely, Nagara, Nakara, Halaru, Nagara samooha, Nakarasamooh, Mahanagara, Bananjupattana etc. Residential Tax was called Manevana and other Taxes were called Jakati. Shanuboga, Senabhovaru were the people who collected the Tax.

== Overview ==
Urban local bodies in Karnataka are segregated into multiple categories like City Corporations, City Municipalities, Town Municipalities and Town Panchayats based on their population. They are governed according 1964 Act for Municipalities (for City or Town Municipalities and Pattana / Town Panchayats) and 1976 Act for Municipal Corporation (for Corporations). The Government of Karnataka has set the guidelines for municipalities according to the 74th Amendment for the Constitution of India. Accordingly, at present there are 10 City Corporations, 59 City Municipal Councils, 116 Town Municipal Councils and 97 Town / Pattana Panchayats in Karnataka. Government has created Notified Area Committees (Four NACs in number) to provide municipal services for specified areas like industrial areas. The main sources of income for the municipalities are:

- Revenue collection from buildings and lands
- Water supply billing
- Licensing for the Infrastructure building and Trade
- Taxing on the advertisement
- Duty on certain transfers of property

== Administrative units ==
They are categorized based on life style of the inhabitants.

=== Urban local bodies ===
According to 2011 census of India, Karnataka has about 39.6% of total population living in urbanized areas. Considering the demography, they are further classified into the following categories.

1. City Corporation
2. City Municipal Council
3. Town Municipal Council
4. Town Panchayat

=== Rural local bodies ===
Rural local bodies include the panchayat raj institutions of this state. There are three levels in this system as follows.

1. Village Panchayat
2. Taluk Panchayat
3. District Panchayat

=== Panchayat details by districts ===
==== Grama Panchayat details ====
District Name	No of GPs	No. of Officers	No. of Previous Members	No. of Current Members
Bagalkote	198	2126	2804	3179
Bengaluru Urban	93	2343	1630	2439
Bengaluru Rural	101	2055	1650	1901
Belagavi	506	5393	8309	8396
Ballari and Vijayanagara (Except Harapanahalli Taluk)	237	2441	3310	3652
Bidar	185	2621	2873	3127
Vijayapura	212	2741	3512	3914
Chamarajanagara	130	1972	2009	2045
Chikkamagaluru	226	2147	2334	2305
Chitradurga	189	2630	3136	3380
Dakshina Kannada	228	1717	3186	3422
Davanagere and Harapanahalli Taluk of Vijayanagara	196	2628	3196	3238
Dharwad	144	1447	1734	2029
Gadag	122	1443	1578	1726
Kalaburagi	263	3591	3817	3897
Hassan	267	3852	3603	3682
Haveri	223	2244	2872	3139
Kodagu	104	827	1230	1356
Kolar	156	2890	2508	2726
Koppal	153	2157	2562	2597
Mandya	233	3440	3658	3632
Mysuru	266	3693	4144	4683
Raichur	179	2561	3222	3265
Shivamogga	271	2526	2753	2707
Tumakuru	330	5402	5206	5312
Udupi	158	1300	2255	2466
Uttara Kannada	231	1815	2577	2690
Chikkaballapura	157	2589	2322	2437
Ramanagara	127	2409	2056	2031
Yadagiri	123	1756	1989	2245
TOTAL	6021	76756	88035	93618

==== Taluk Panchayat details ====
District Name	No of Taluks	No. of Officers	No. of Previous Members	No. of Elected Members	No. of Elected Members Entered
Bagalkote	6	100	118	130	129
Bengaluru Urban	4	80	72	97	94
Bengaluru Rural	4	77	68	77	77
Belagavi	10	191	338	345	344
Ballari and Vijayanagara (Except Harapanahalli Taluk)	7	147	133	176	149
Bidar	5	92	118	131	127
Vijayapura	5	108	144	159	159
Chamarajanagara	4	53	85	89	89
Chikkamagaluru	7	94	109	107	107
Chitradurga	6	88	128	136	136
Dakshina Kannada	5	93	123	136	136
Davanagere and Harapanahalli Taluk of Vijayanagara	6	72	129	107	125
Dharwad	5	92	76	82	82
Gadag	5	71	71	75	75
Kalaburagi	7	137	155	179	177
Hassan	8	100	144	153	151
Haveri	7	111	115	128	126
Kodagu	3	49	49	50	50
Kolar	5	75	102	111	110
Koppal	4	65	102	109	105
Mandya	7	186	156	155	153
Mysuru	7	108	171	187	182
Raichur	5	81	113	142	117
Shivamogga	7	96	72	116	116
Tumakuru	10	181	203	215	215
Udupi	3	54	95	98	98
Uttara Kannada	11	159	129	130	129
Chikkaballapura	6	93	99	108	107
Ramanagara	4	67	79	81	81
Yadagiri	3	51	82	94	83
TOTAL	176	2971	3578	3903	3829

==== Zilla Panchayat details ====
District Name	No. of Officers	No. of Previous Members	No. of Elected Members	No. of Elected Members Entered
Bagalkote	75	32	36	35
Bengaluru Urban	62	34	50	50
Bengaluru Rural	74	18	21	21
Belagavi	86	86	90	90
Ballari and Vijayanagara (Except Harapanahalli Taluk)	50	36	40	40
Bidar	98	31	34	34
Vijayapura	42	38	42	42
Chamarajanagara	59	21	23	23
Chikkamagaluru	92	34	33	33
Chitradurga	56	33	37	37
Dakshina Kannada	36	34	36	36
Davanagere and Harapanahalli Taluk of Vijayanagara	102	35	36	36
Dharwad	54	22	22	22
Gadag	35	18	19	19
Kalaburagi	65	35	47	47
Hassan	62	40	40	40
Haveri	62	30	34	34
Kodagu	62	29	29	29
Kolar	52	28	30	30
Koppal	45	20	29	29
Mandya	80	40	41	41
Mysuru	71	46	49	49
Raichur	29	35	38	38
Shivamogga	64	31	31	31
Tumakuru	57	57	57	57
Udupi	39	25	26	26
Uttara Kannada	40	36	39	39
Chikkaballapura	51	26	28	28
Ramanagara	61	21	22	22
Yadagiri	71	22	24	24
TOTAL	1832	993	1083	1082

== Elections ==
Elections are conducted by Karnataka State Election Commission and held once in five years. Karnataka State Election Commissioner is appointed by Governor of Karnataka. Head of the Panchayats includes:

- Urban bodies
1. Corporators are the members of a city corporation led by a mayor.
2. Councillors are the members of a city/town municipal council led by a chairman.
3. Councillors are the members of a town panchayat led by a president.
- Rural bodies
1. Councillors are the members of a Village/Taluk/District Panchayat led by a president

== See also ==
- 2021 Karnataka local elections
