= Panchayati raj =

Form of local government

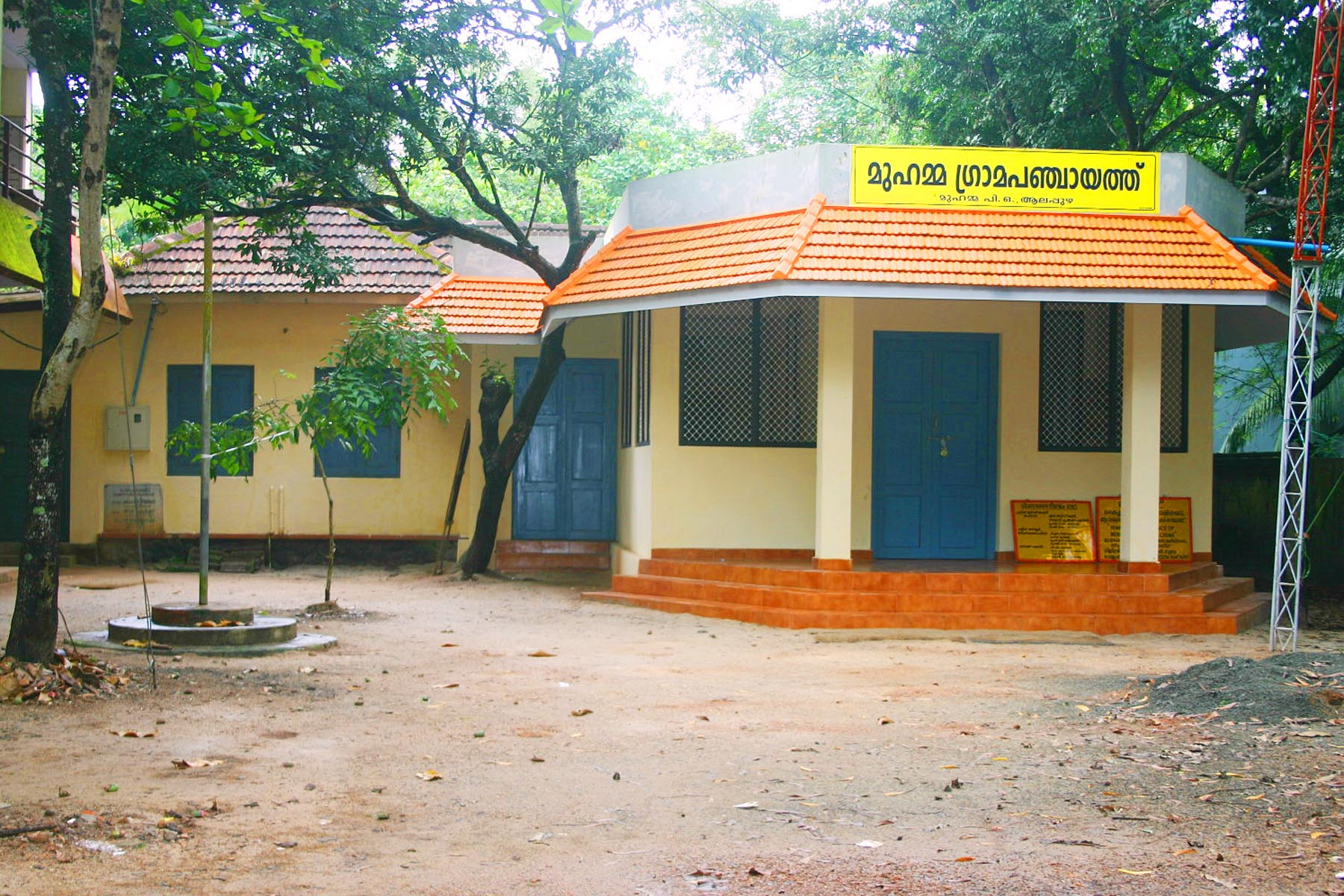
A Panchayat office in Muhamma, Kerala

The Panchayati raj is a political system originating from the Indian subcontinent, primarily found in India and neighbouring countries Pakistan, Bangladesh, Sri Lanka, and Nepal. It is one of the oldest systems of local government in the Indian subcontinent, with historical mentions dating back to around 250 CE. The word 'raj' means 'rule,' and panchayat' means 'assembly' (ayat) of 'five' (panch). Traditionally, panchayats consisted of wise and respected elders chosen and accepted by the local community. These assemblies resolved disputes between individuals and villages. However, there were various forms of such assemblies.

The leader of the panchayat was often called the president, mukhiya, sarpanch, or pradhan, which was an elected or generally acknowledged position. The modern panchayati raj system of India and its gram panchayats should not be confused with the traditional system or the extra-constitutional khap panchayats (or caste panchayats) of northern India.

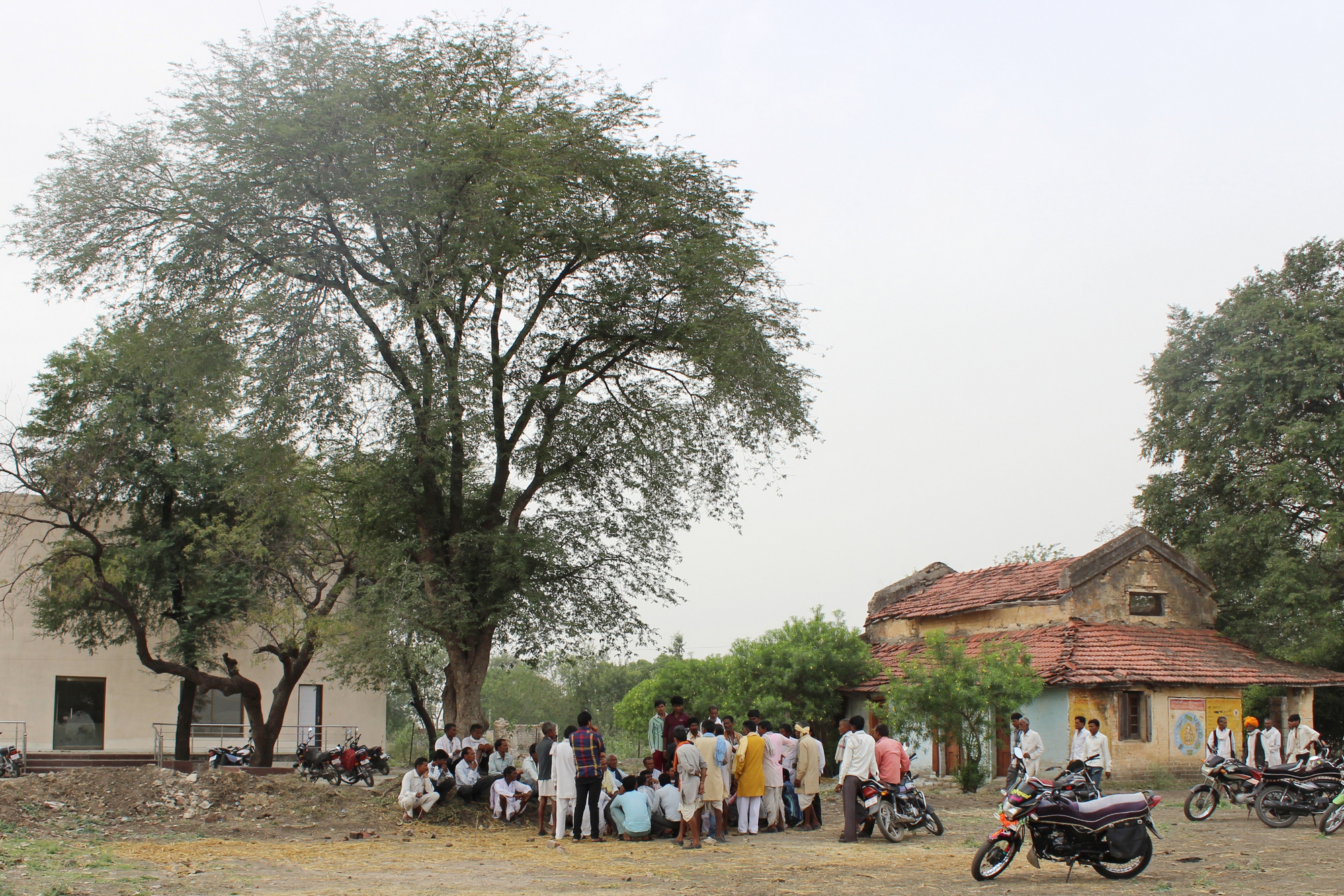
Open Panchayat near Narsingarh, Madhya Pradesh

Mahatma Gandhi advocated for panchayat raj system as the foundation of India's political system. It was envisioned as a decentralized form of government, where each village would be responsible for its own affairs. This vision was termed Gram Swaraj ("village self-governance"). While India developed a highly centralized system of government, this has been moderated by delegating several administrative functions to the local level, thereby empowering elected gram panchayats.

Jawaharlal Nehru inaugurated the panchayati raj system at Nagaur on 2 October 1959. The date was chosen to coincide with Mahatma Gandhi's birthday. Gandhi envisioned Gram Swaraj through the panchayati raj system. The system was later modified in 1992.

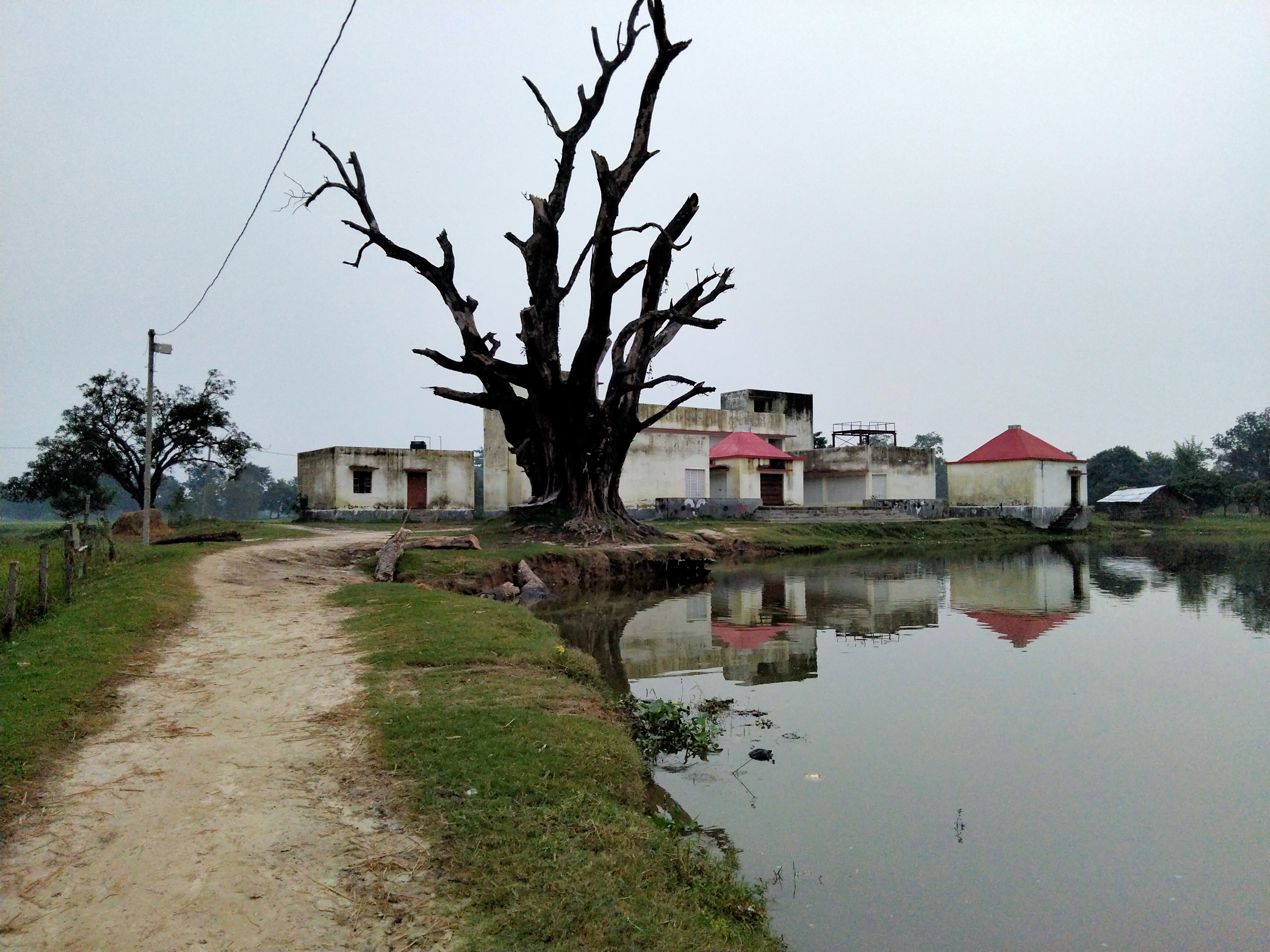
View of the Grampanchayat Raj Bhavan at Basuki Bihari North

== In the Indian subcontinent ==
=== Early history ===
The Hindu text Rigveda (1700 BCE) provides evidence suggesting that self-governing village bodies called sabhas existed. Over time, these bodies evolved into panchayats (five-person councils). Panchayats were functional institutions of grassroots governance in almost every village. The village panchayat or elected council had significant powers, both executive and judicial. It distributed land, collected taxes from the produce, and paid the government's share on behalf of the village. Above these village councils, a larger panchayat or council existed to supervise and intervene if necessary. However, casteism and the feudalistic system of governance under Mughal rule during the medieval period gradually eroded self-government in villages. A new class of feudal chiefs and revenue collectors (zamindars) emerged between the ruler and the people, leading to the stagnation and decline of self-government in villages.

A detailed account of how a medieval South Indian village council functioned is carved into a temple wall in Uthiramerur, a village in Tamil Nadu, approximately 85 kilometers (53 miles) west of Chennai. Thirty council members were chosen by lot, a form of sortition. Males were eligible for selection if they were of good character and met certain requirements based on landholdings and knowledge of Hindu scriptures. They were then assigned to various committees responsible for irrigation works, gardens, and other matters.

=== During British rule ===
The British were generally not concerned with local administration, leaving it to the local rulers. They did not interfere with existing panchayati systems or encourage rulers to consider more democratic institutions at the local level. The rulers were interested in creating 'controlled' local bodies that could assist in their trading interests by collecting taxes on their behalf. When the colonial administration faced severe financial pressure after the 1857 uprising, decentralization was pursued by transferring responsibility for road and public works to local bodies. However, this 'compelled' decentralization primarily focused on municipal administration.

The panchayat was dismantled by the East India Company when it was granted the office of Diwan in 1765 in Bengal by the nawab, as part of reparation following his defeat at Buxar. As Diwan, the Company made two key decisions. First, it abolished the village land record office and established a company official called the Patwari, who became the official record keeper for multiple villages. Second, it created the office of magistrate and abolished the village police. The magistrate performed policing functions through the Darogha, who had always been a state functionary under the Faujdar. The primary purpose of these measures was the collection of land revenue by decree. The depredations of the Patwari and the Darogha, which became a part of Indian folklore, contributed to the worst famine in Bengal, with its effects lingering until the end of the 18th century. These measures completely disempowered the village community and destroyed the panchayat. After 1857, the British attempted to restore the panchayat by granting it powers to try minor offences and resolve village disputes, but these measures did not restore the lost powers of the village community.

From 1870, when Lord Mayo's Resolution on decentralization aimed to improve administrative efficiency, meet public demands, and bolster colonial finances, there was significant impetus for the development of local institutions. This resolution was a landmark in the evolution of colonial policy towards local government. However, the real benchmark for government policy on decentralization can be attributed to Lord Ripon. In his famous resolution on local self-government on 18 May 1882, Ripon addressed the twin considerations of administrative efficiency and political education. The Ripon Resolution, which focused on towns, provided for local bodies consisting of a large majority of elected non-official members and presided over by a non-official chairperson. This resolution faced resistance from colonial administrators, and the progress of local self-government was slow, with only half-hearted efforts made in setting up municipal bodies. Rural decentralization, in particular, remained a neglected area of administrative reform.

The Royal Commission on Decentralization (1907), chaired by Sir H. W. Primrose, recognized the importance of panchayats at the village level. The commission recommended that 'it is most desirable, both in the interests of decentralization and to involve the people in the local administration tasks, to attempt to constitute and develop village panchayats for the administration of local village affairs.'

However, the Montague-Chelmsford Reforms (1919) introduced local self-government as a provincial transferred subject, coming under the domain of Indian ministers in the provinces. Due to organizational and fiscal constraints, the reforms were unable to make panchayat institutions truly democratic and vibrant. Nevertheless, a significant development of this period was the 'establishment of village panchayats in several provinces, which were no longer mere ad hoc judicial tribunals but representative institutions symbolizing the corporate character of the village and having wide jurisdiction over civic matters.' By 1925, eight provinces had enacted panchayat acts, and by 1926, six native states had also passed panchayat laws.

Provincial autonomy under the Government of India Act, 1935, marked the evolution of panchayats in India. Elected provincial governments enacted legislation to further democratize local self-government institutions. However, the system of responsible government at the grassroots level was notably ineffective. D. P. Mishra, the then minister for local self-government under the Government of India Act of 1935 in the Central Provinces, observed that "the working of our local bodies ... in our province and perhaps in the whole country presents a tragic picture ... 'Inefficiency' and 'local body' have become synonymous terms."

Despite various committees such as the Royal Commission on Decentralization (1907), the Montagu-Chelmsford Report on constitutional reform (1919), and the Government of India Resolution (1919), a hierarchical administrative structure based on supervision and control evolved. The administrator became the focal point of rural governance. The British were not concerned with decentralized democracy but were pursuing colonial objectives.

From the 1920s to 1947, the Indian National Congress emphasized the issue of all-India Swaraj and organized movements for independence under the leadership of Mahatma Gandhi. As a result, the task of preparing a blueprint for local governance was neglected. There was no consensus among the top leaders regarding the status and role of rural local self-government, leading to divergent views on the subject. Gandhi favored Village Swaraj and aimed to strengthen the village panchayat to the fullest extent, while Dr. B.R. Ambedkar opposed this idea. He viewed the village as a symbol of regressive India and a source of oppression, believing that the model state needed safeguards against such social oppression, which could only be achieved through the adoption of the parliamentary model of politics. During the drafting of the Constitution of India, Panchayati Raj Institutions were included in the non-justiciable part of the Constitution, the Directive Principles of State Policy, as Article 40. This Article stated, 'The State shall take steps to organize village panchayats and endow them with such powers and authority as may be necessary to enable them to function as units of self-government.' However, no substantial legislation was enacted at either the national or state level to implement it.

Jawaharlal Nehru inaugurated the Panchayati Raj system at Nagaur, Rajasthan, on 2 October 1959, to coincide with Mahatma Gandhi's birthday. Gandhi had envisioned Gram Swaraj through Panchayati Raj. Rajasthan was the first state to implement it. Nehru also inaugurated Panchayati Raj in Andhra Pradesh on 11 October 1959, on the occasion of Dussehra. The system was gradually established across India.

In the four decades since the adoption of the Constitution, panchayat raj institutions have evolved from being part of the non-justiciable Directive Principles to acquiring a new status through a separate constitutional amendment.

=== Post-Independence period ===
Panchayat raj went through various stages. The First Five-Year Plan failed to achieve active participation and involvement of the people in Plan processes, including formulation, implementation, and monitoring. The Second Five-Year Plan aimed to cover the entire countryside through National Extension Service Blocks, utilizing Block Development Officers, Assistant Development Officers, Village Level Workers, as well as nominated representatives of village panchayats and other popular organizations like cooperative societies. However, this plan did not satisfactorily accomplish decentralization. Consequently, various committees were constituted to advise the central government on different aspects of decentralization.

To advance the Gandhian goal of direct political participation at the grassroots level, the National Development Council appointed a committee under Balwant Rai Mehta in 1957. The committee submitted its report in 1958, recommending a three-tier structure consisting of a Zila Parishad at the district level, a Panchayat Samiti at the block level, and a Gram Panchayat at the village level.

The next major change in the panchayat system of India came with the passage of the Panchayati Raj Act (73rd Amendment) in 1992. A key motivation behind this act was the belief that local governments could be more effective than centrally appointed bureaucrats in identifying and responding to the needs of villages. Consequently, this act was a significant step in India's move towards decentralization.

The main features of this act are: (a) a three-tier system of Panchayati Raj for all states with a population of over 20 lakh; (b) regular Panchayat elections every five years; (c) reservation of seats for Scheduled Castes, Scheduled Tribes, and women (not less than one-third of the seats); and (d) the appointment of a State Finance Commission to recommend the financial powers of the Panchayats. Thus, in theory, Panchayats have been given sufficient authority to function as institutions of self-governance and promote social justice.

There have been several positive effects of this amendment, some of which are listed above. However, there is also evidence of deeply ingrained vote-trading structures maintained through extra-political means. This issue can potentially be attributed to the fact that Gram Sabhas have not been sufficiently empowered and strengthened to ensure greater public participation and transparency in the functioning of Panchayats, as envisaged in the Panchayat Act.

== See also ==
- Panchayat (Nepal)
- Khap panchayat
