= Seventy-third Amendment of the Constitution of India =

Amendment of the Constitution of India

The Seventy-third Amendment of the Constitution of India, officially known as The Constitution (Seventy-third Amendment) Act, 1992, granted constitutional status to the Panchayati Raj institutions and provided a framework for rural local self-government. It came into effect on 24 April 1993 by adding Part IX (Articles 243–243O) and the Eleventh Schedule, which lists twenty-nine subjects to be devolved to Panchayats. The amendment established a three-tier system of Panchayati Raj, mandated regular elections every five years, reserved seats for Scheduled Castes, Scheduled Tribes, and women and provided for State Election Commissions and State Finance Commissions.
